= 2023–2024 transport strikes in the Philippines =

Protests on public transport modernization

- Part of protests against the Public Utility Vehicle Modernization Program and Bongbong Marcos
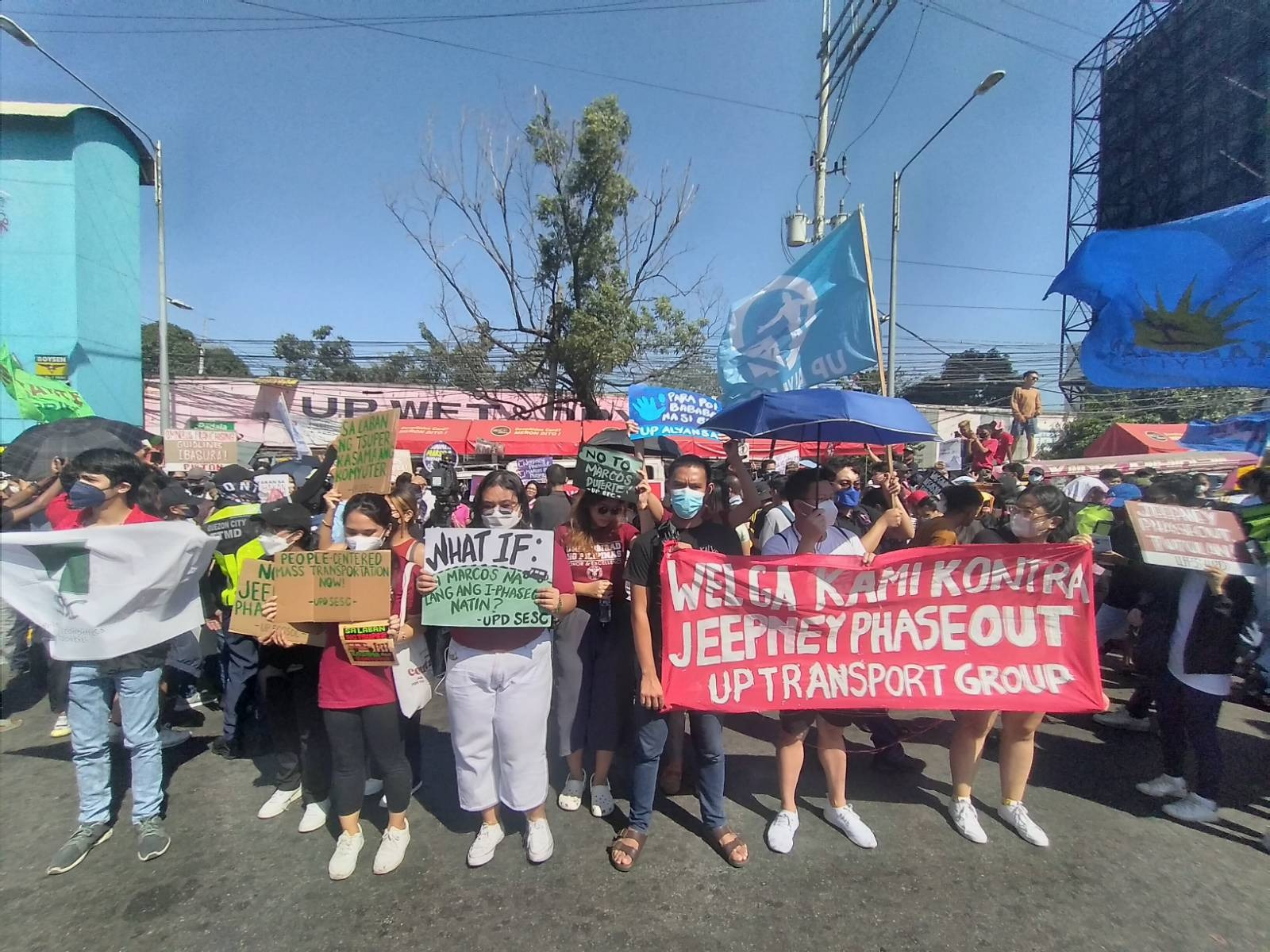
- Students of the University of the Philippines Diliman and other protesters express solidarity with the striking jeepney drivers, Quezon City, March 6, 2023
- Date: March 6, 2023 – present (3 years, 8 months and 2 weeks)
- Location: Philippines
- Caused by: Government's plan to phase out jeepneys over 15 years old, directive for operators to form cooperatives
- Methods: Protest, strike action

Parties
Philippine government; Department of Transportation; Land Transportation Franchising and Regulatory Board; Pro-PUVMP Public transport groups; Pasang Masda; United Transport Consolidated Entities of the Philippines	Anti-PUVMP Public transport groups; Manibela; United Transport Federation; PISTON

Lead figures
Bongbong Marcos; Jaime Bautista; Teofilo Guadiz II; Obet Martin (Pasang Masda)	Mar Valbuena (Manibela); Mody Floranda (PISTON)

Since March 2023, a series of transport strikes by operators of traditional public jeepneys and minivans have been held in various cities across the Philippines to protest against the Public Utility Vehicle Modernization Program.

These strikes are a continuation of such protests that were held in 2017–2019.

== Background ==
Organizers of the strike are protesting against the Philippine government's Public Utility Vehicle Modernization Program, which intends to phase out dilapidated and old or traditional jeepneys and utility vans meant for public transport. Traditional jeepneys are a legacy of World War II, with designs not changing much apart from the addition of secondhand engines from Japanese manufacturers. There was no mandatory retirement age for commercial vehicles in the Philippines.

The modernization program was launched in 2017 and is mainly implemented by the Department of Transportation (DOTr) and the Land Transportation Franchising and Regulatory Board (LTFRB). It is aimed to replace public utility vehicles (PUVs), including jeepneys and buses that are at least 15 years old with newer models that are more eco-friendly within the next three years. Though reportedly in practice, this covered all traditional jeepneys.

The strike organizers' main goal is to have the government increase the subsidy of ₱200,000 to enable them to purchase new utility vehicles. The government also has urged operators to form cooperatives for them to have a better borrowing capacity but critics said that this is still insufficient. This proposal was made through LTFRB's memorandum circular 2023–013, which also suspends provisional authority for operators who fail to comply.

=== Participants ===
The strike is led by Manibela, a group of public transport group that claims to represent 40,000 drivers. They are aiming to halt the planned phaseout of PUVs originally set on June 30, 2023. They are joined by the United Transport Federation and Laban TNVS (under the No to PUV Phaseout Coalition), and are supported by commuter group PARA - Advocates for Inclusive Transport.

The LTFRB on their part says they are not pressured, claiming that 90 percent of transport groups support the modernization program. The Metropolitan Manila Development Authority (MMDA) claims that eight groups will not participate: Pinagkaisang Samahan ng mga Tsuper at Operators Nationwide (Piston), Federation of Jeepney Operators and Drivers Association of the Philippines (Fejodap), UV Express group, Association of Concerned Transport Organizations (Acto), Pasang Masda, Liga ng Transportasyon at Operators sa Pilipinas (LTOP), Alliance of Transport Operators and Drivers Association of the Philippines (Altodap), and Northern Mindanao Federation of Transport Service Cooperative (Nomfedtrasco). Piston later decided to join.

=== Locations ===
- Bicol Region
- Calabarzon
- Central Luzon
- Metro Manila
- Cagayan de Oro

=== Goals ===
Organizers urged for the cancellation of LTFRB Memorandum Circular No. 2023-013, which mandates operators to join a cooperative before they could engage with the LTFRB for dialogue.

The protesters contend that franchise consolidation and the requirement to join cooperatives will raise transport costs and force thousands of drivers and operators out of their jobs. Transport and consumer groups argued in a petition to the Philippine Supreme Court that the requirement undermines property rights, unjustly singles out jeepneys, coerces them to join a group and impinges on their constitutional right to free association, and forces drivers to lose their small enterprises.

== Strikes ==
=== 2023 ===
==== March 6–7 ====
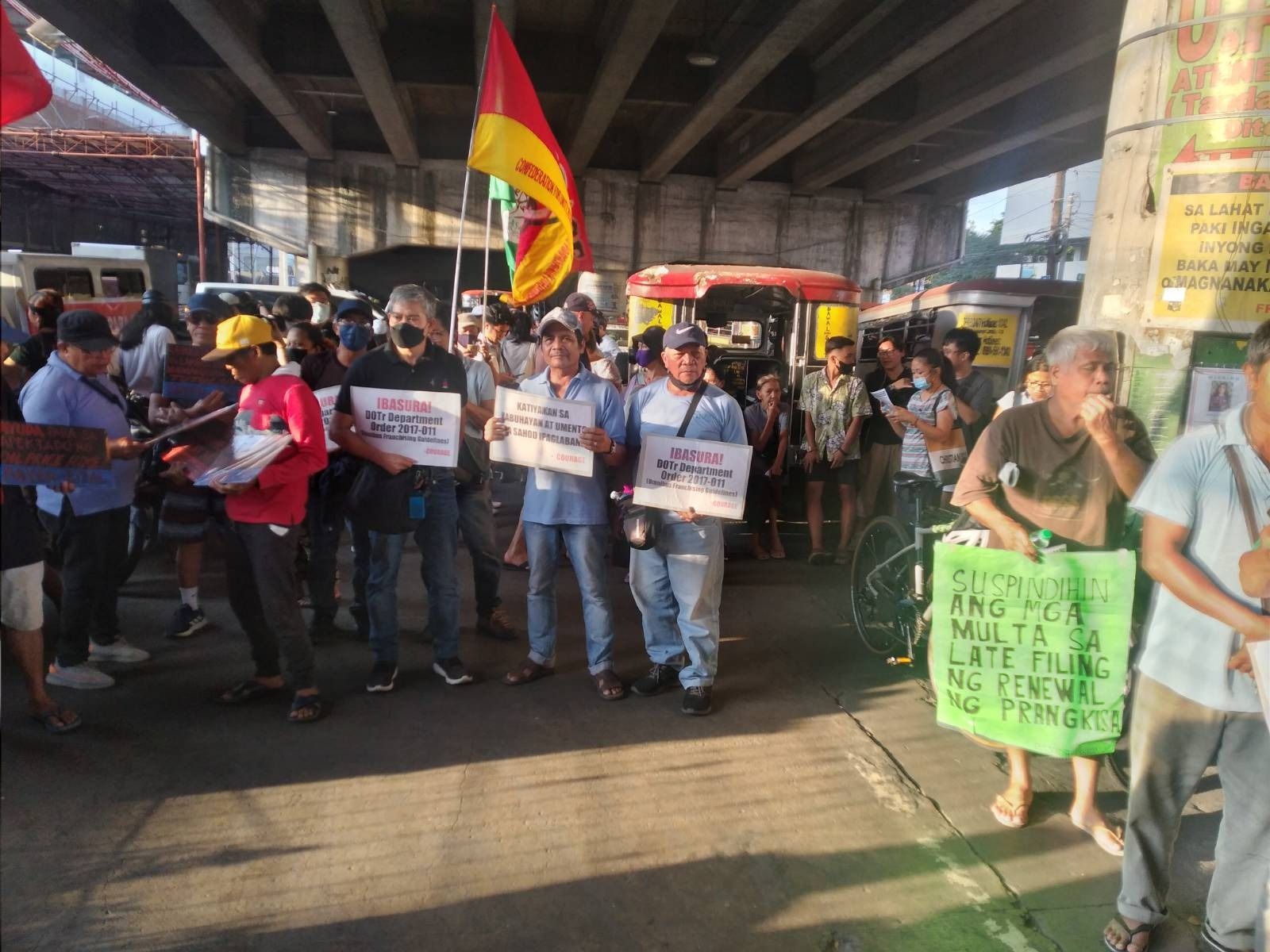
Mobilization at Katipunan Avenue, Quezon City.

The Bagong Alyansang Makabayan was allowed to organize protests at Mendiola, Manila in parallel and support of the transport strike by the Manila Police District.

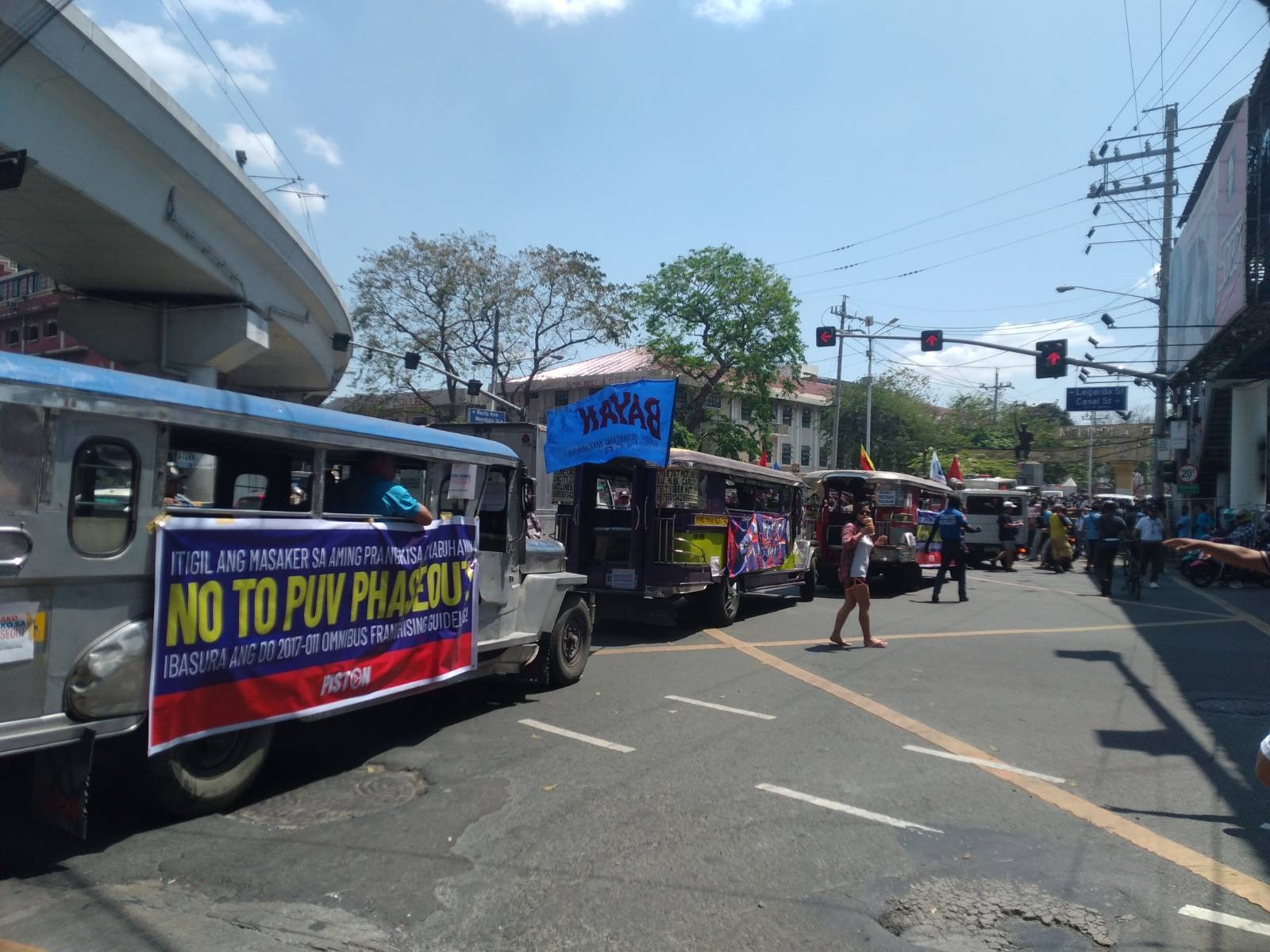
Jeepneys on strike, caravan to Mendiola.

The government has downplayed the impact of the strike. The Metropolitan Manila Development Authority claims that the strike failed to paralyze commuters in Metro Manila. According to Piston, the majority of jeepneys and UV Express services along nine locales in Metro Manila and Calabarzon had ceased operations to participate in the strike.

Affected inter routes include:

- Routes between the city of Antipolo and municipality of Taytay
- Routes between Cogeo in the city of Antipolo and Cubao in Quezon City
- Routes between Novaliches in Quezon City, and Blumentritt Road in Santa Cruz, Manila
- Routes between Pala-pala Road in Dasmariñas and the city of Imus
- Routes between the municipality of Los Baños and the city of Calamba

Affected intra routes include:

- Routes within the cities of Pasay and Parañaque, particularly in Baclaran
- Routes within the city of Calamba
- Routes within the city of Cabuyao

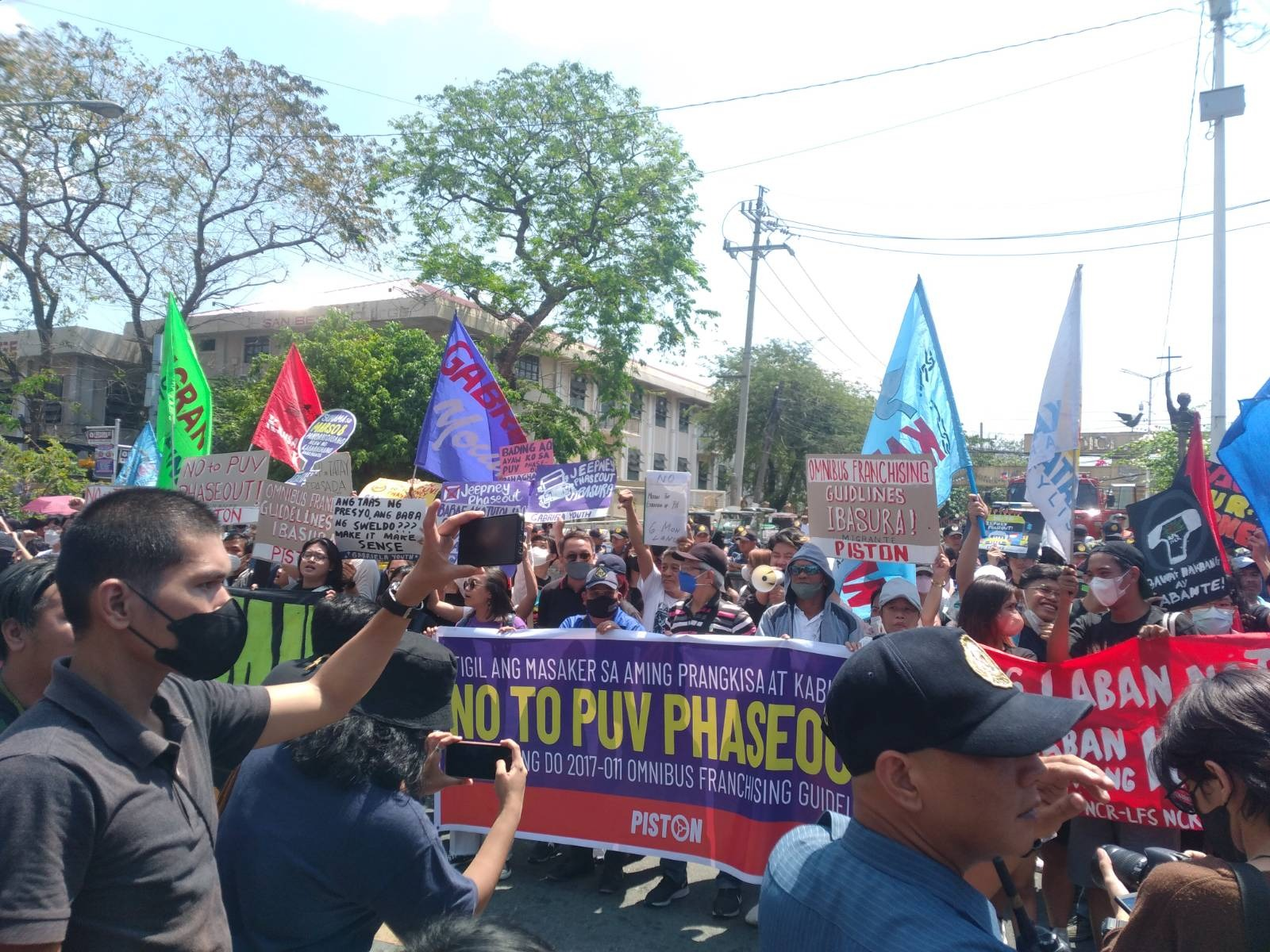
Mobilization at Mendiola, Manila.

However, according to the LTFRB, only 10 percent of routes in Metro Manila and 5 percent of routes nationwide were affected by the strike, asserting that these gaps were addressed by the free rides provided by the government.

Although Manibela and Piston considered the first day of the strike as a success because a lot of would-be commuters, including students who attended classes which were held online in anticipation of the protest action, decided to not go out to the streets, Manibela and Piston continued their strike on March 7, vowing to continue until the modernization program is completely put to a halt.

==== July 24 ====
Manibela was originally slated to hold a three-day strike from July 24 to 26, with the first day coinciding with the second State of the Nation Address of President Bongbong Marcos. However, in light of the heavy rains and Typhoon Doksuri (Egay), Manibela suspended the strike, citing the commuters' call for adequate transportation.

==== October 16 ====
Manibela held a nationwide transport strike on October 16. The group urged the government to take action on the alleged corruption of the LTFRB. About 240,000 traditional jeepney operators joined the strike.

==== November 20–24 ====
PISTON held a three-day transport trike set from November 20 to 22. However, Manibela also held a similar but separate strike from November 22 to 24. At least 200,000 traditional jeepney operators joined the strike.

==== December ====
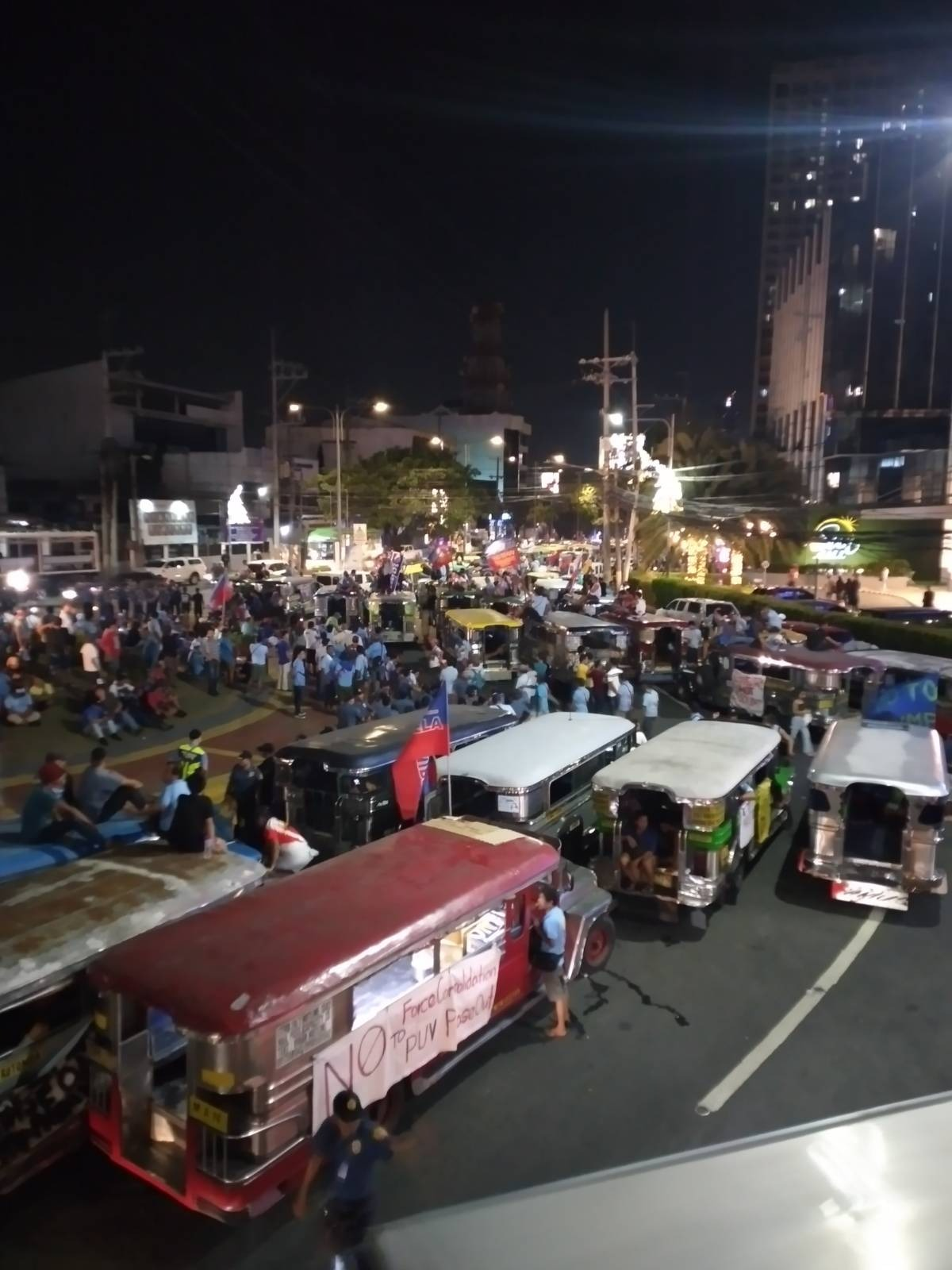
January 16 strike, barricading Welcome Rotonda, Quezon City

On December 11, 2023, PISTON and its allies announced a two-day nationwide transport strike that will be held on December 14 and 15, 2023, to protest the December 31 deadline set by the LTFRB for transport franchise consolidation. A day later, PISTON also announced that the strike will continue, despite Bongbong Marcos' announcement that there will be no extension for franchise consolidation. The group claimed a 90% paralysis rate on major routes inside Metro Manila, and a paralysis rate of 85% on routes outside Metro Manila.

On December 12, a pro-modernization group, United Transport Consolidated Entities of the Philippines, held a rally against transport strikes by PISTON and Manibela, opposition to the deadline extension, and to support the 2024 budget and PUVMP. At least 400 PUV operators and drivers have joined the rally.

After the initial two-day strike led by PISTON, the group, together with Manibela, announced an extension of the transport strikes from December 18 to 29, a move precipitated by the LTFRB's signing of the memorandum circular 2023-051 which effectively bans unconsolidated PUVs to operate beyond December 31.

=== 2024 ===
==== January ====
John Lazaro, national coordinator of Samahan ng Progresibong Kabataan stated that the group would continue to support drivers and operators as long as the government proceeds with its modernization policy, which the was said to be formulated without adequate consultation with the transport sector, stating that “If the government continues to make policies that actively harm the livelihood of the working class, then we have a duty to stand by them,”.

PISTON and Manibela held another strike on January 16 to persuade Bongbong Marcos to reinstate the franchises of drivers and operators of unconsolidated PUVs. A week later, on January 24, Marcos extended the consolidation deadline to April 30, upon the recommendation of the DOTr.

On February 7, 2024, Manibela protested in front of the Ombudsman of the Philippines and sued several members of DOTr, LTFRB, the Office of Transportation Cooperatives (OTC), and the Office of the Solicitor General. Manibela claims that the members in question were violating Section 3, Paragraph (e) of the Anti-Graft and Corrupt Practices Act (Republic Act No. 3019) and Section 4 of the Ethical Standards for Public Officials and Employees (RA No. 6713).

==== April–June ====
PISTON and Manibela held a transport strike from April 15 to 16. PISTON held another strike from April 29 to May 1, Labor Day. Manibela later held a strike from June 10 to 12 (Independence Day) to protest the apprehension of unconsolidated jeepneys.

==== July–August ====
In July, jeepney drivers held protests in Bacolod City. Protesters included members of United Negros Drivers and Operators Center-Pagkakaisa ng mga Samahan ng Tsuper at Opereytor Nationwide (UNDOC-PISTON) and Bacolod Commuters, Operators, and Drivers Association-Federation of Drivers, Commuters, and United Transportation Terminals (BACOD-Manibela). Displaced drivers called on the president to scrap the public utility vehicle modernization program. There are about 3,000 drivers of traditional jeepneys in Bacolod.

On August 14 and 15, UNDOC, BACOD, the Kabacod Negros Transport Coalition (KNETCO), and the National Workers Coalition held demonstrations in different parts of Bacolod City, such as the Bata flyover, Magsaysay flyover, Burgos Public Cemetery, and Libertad Market. KNETCO said the modernization program is an "anti-poor program" that harms thousands of jeepney drivers, operators, and their families.

==== September ====
PISTON and Manibela held a nationwide transport strike on September 23 and 24 to protest the Public Transport Modernization Program. PISTON filed a petition asking the Supreme Court to issue a temporary restraining order to suspend the program.

== Response ==
=== National government ===
President Bongbong Marcos urged transport groups to reconsider the March 2023 strikes, appealing to their potential impact on commuters. He said that the modernization program is a must but expressed apprehension about the program's immediate implementation. He acknowledged the need to engage in dialogue to tweak the program's implementation to reduce the financial burden of the operators. He has proposed alternatives to its implementation such as allowing old utility vehicles that pass an inspection to continue operating. The LTFRB would move the deadline of phaseout from June 30, 2023, to December 31, 2023.

The Department of Education (DepEd) announced that there would be no suspension of classes during the March 2023 strikes but said that those who are not able to attend physically should be allowed to "continue to learn through Alternative Delivery Modes". Select universities in Metro Manila have announced a shift to online classes for the duration of the strike. However, on July 24, which was supposed to be the first day of the second strike, President Marcos suspended classes in public schools and government work due to the strike as well as inclement weather caused by Typhoon Doksuri (Egay).

=== Local governments ===
All mayors of localities of Metro Manila and the MMDA have pledged to provide free rides to commuters who would be affected by the March 2023 strike.

== Aftermath ==
Following a meeting with the Presidential Communications Office at Malacañang Palace on March 7, PISTON and Manibela declared an end to the initial strike. They announced the resumption of regular operations for its drivers starting the following day. The initial strike ended five days earlier than the originally planned date of March 12.

Manibela chairperson Mar Valbuena later revealed on the evening of March 7 that the administration had agreed to delay the implementation of the program to December 31, 2023, and to use the intervening months to review all the aspects of the program implementation, taking the concerns of drivers, operators, and other stakeholders into account.

The Supreme Court of the Philippines in a 20-page decision dated July 11, 2023, but promulgated on March 4, 2024, dismissed Bayyo Association Inc. and transport groups petition to nullify the Public Utility Vehicle Modernization Program provisions that compel jeepney drivers and operators to replace their traditional units with modern ones. The ponente Maria Filomena Singh ruled: “In view of the petitioners' lack of legal standing and their disregard of the doctrine of hierarchy of courts, the Court will not delve into the merits of the substantive arguments raised.” It however did not rule on the constitutionality of paragraph 5.2 of DoTr Order No. 2017-011 which mandates transport cooperatives to “modernize” and replace their old units with “brand new and environmentally-friendly units.”

== See also ==
- 2017–2019 transport strikes in the Philippines
- Protests against Bongbong Marcos
