= 2016 Philippine House of Representatives party-list election =

Elections were held for seats reserved for the party-list representation in the House of Representatives of the Philippines on May 9, 2016. At most 20% of the seats in the House of Representatives of the Philippines are reserved for party-list representatives. The election was via the party-list system, with a 2% "soft" election threshold via the Hare quota, except that no party can win more than 3 seats, and if the seats won do not reach the 20% of the seats of the entire House of Representatives, the parties that have yet to win seats will get a seat each until the 20% reserved for party-lists have been filled up.

As a result of the creation of new legislative districts during the 16th Congress, the number of party-list seats available for the 2016 elections was increased by one.

== Raffle ==
On December 14, 2015, the commission raffled the parties on the order that they will appear on the ballot, as was done in the 2013 elections. This is to avoid parties using numbers or the letter "A" or the number "1" as the first letter of their party to be seen first by the voter. Only the order in which the parties would be listed was determined; the respective numbers would be determined after petitions for disqualification of certain parties were dealt with.

== Nominees ==
The COMELEC released the list of nominees of every party that appears on the ballot.

== Results ==
Party	Votes	%	+/–	Seats	+/–
Ako Bicol Political Party	1,664,975	5.14	+2.38	3	+1
Gabriela Women's Party	1,367,795	4.22	+1.64	2	0
1-Pacman Party List	1,310,197	4.05	New	2	New
Alliance of Concerned Teachers	1,180,752	3.65	+2.00	2	+1
Senior Citizens Partylist	988,876	3.05	+0.60	2	0
Kabalikat ng Mamamayan	840,393	2.60	New	2	New
AGRI Partylist	833,821	2.58	+1.25	2	+1
PBA Partylist	780,309	2.41	+1.64	2	New
Buhay Party-List	760,912	2.35	−2.25	2	−1
Abono Partylist	732,060	2.26	−0.52	2	0
Anak Mindanao	706,689	2.18	+0.80	2	+1
Coop-NATCCO	671,699	2.07	−0.25	2	0
Akbayan	608,449	1.88	−1.12	1	−1
Bayan Muna	606,566	1.87	−1.58	1	−1
AGAP Partylist	593,748	1.83	−0.31	1	−1
An Waray (Note: An Waray was granted a second representative in 2013 without a proclamation from the Commission on Elections; the seat change refers to the de jure ruling, where An Waray is only entitled to one seat from 2013 and is unchanged in 2016, against the de facto 2 seats occupied by the party as the result of the 2013 election.)	590,895	1.82	−0.13	1	0
Citizens' Battle Against Corruption	555,760	1.72	−0.40	1	−1
AAMBIS-Owa Party List	495,483	1.53	+0.40	1	0
Kalinga Partylist	494,725	1.53	+0.18	1	0
A Teacher Partylist	475,488	1.47	−2.31	1	−1
You Against Corruption and Poverty	471,173	1.46	+0.13	1	0
Democratic Independent Workers Association	467,794	1.44	+0.21	1	0
Trade Union Congress Party	467,275	1.44	+0.11	1	0
Abang Lingkod	466,701	1.44	+0.50	1	0
LPG Marketers Association	466,103	1.44	+0.10	1	0
Alliance of Organizations Networks and Associations of the Philippines	434,856	1.34	New	1	New
SAGIP Partylist	397,064	1.23	+0.18	1	0
Butil Farmers Party	395,011	1.22	−0.37	1	0
Acts-Overseas Filipino Workers Coalition of Organizations	374,601	1.16	New	1	New
Anakpawis	367,376	1.13	−0.03	1	0
Ang Kabuhayan	348,533	1.08	New	1	New
Angkla: ang Partido ng Pilipinong Marino	337,245	1.04	−0.26	1	0
Ang Mata'y Alagaan	331,285	1.02	+0.14	1	New
1st Consumers Alliance for Rural Energy	329,627	1.02	−2.37	1	−1
Ang National Coalition of Indigenous Peoples Action Na!	318,257	0.98	+0.11	1	0
Arts Business and Science Professionals	301,457	0.93	−0.37	1	0
Kabataan	300,420	0.93	−0.31	1	0
Bagong Henerasyon	299,381	0.92	+0.24	1	New
Ating Aagapay Sentrong Samahan ng mga Obrero	294,281	0.91	+0.67	1	New
Serbisyo sa Bayan Party	280,465	0.87	New	1	New
Magdalo para sa Pilipino	279,356	0.86	−1.19	1	−1
Una ang Edukasyon	278,393	0.86	New	1	New
Manila Teachers Party-List	268,613	0.83	New	1	New
Kusug Tausug	247,487	0.76	New	1	New
Aangat Tayo	243,266	0.75	−0.00	1	New
Agbiag! Timpuyog Ilocano	240,723	0.74	−0.13	1	0
Ating Guro	237,566	0.73	−0.04	0	0
Association for Development Dedicated to Agriculture and Fisheries	226,751	0.70	New	0	0
Abyan Ilonggo	223,880	0.69	New	0	0
Alliance of Philippine Fishing Federations	220,599	0.68	New	0	0
Append	219,218	0.68	−0.18	0	−1
Ang Nars	218,593	0.68	−0.21	0	−1
Abakada Guro	216,405	0.67	−0.22	0	−1
Confederation of Savings and Loan Association	213,814	0.66	New	0	0
Tingog Sinirangan (Tinig ng Silangan)	210,552	0.65	New	0	0
Abante Mindanao	209,276	0.65	−1.04	0	−1
OFW Family Club	203,767	0.63	−2.09	0	−2
Alagaan Natin Ating Kalusugan	191,362	0.59	New	0	0
Alay Buhay Community Development Foundation	186,712	0.58	−0.57	0	−1
Abante Retirees Organization	166,138	0.51	−0.07	0	0
Ako ang Bisaya	162,547	0.50	New	0	0
Alliance of Volunteer Educators	157,792	0.49	−0.49	0	−1
Rebolusyong Alyansang Makabansa	153,743	0.47	New	0	0
Katipunan ng mga Guardians Brotherhood	148,869	0.46	New	0	0
Alyansa ng mga Grupong Haligi ng Agham at Teknolohiya para sa Mamamayan	140,661	0.43	−0.04	0	0
Anti-War/Anti Terror Mindanao Peace Movement	138,040	0.43	+0.28	0	0
Tanggol Maralita	136,555	0.42	New	0	0
Academicians Students and Educators Alliance	125,069	0.39	New	0	0
Allied Movement Employment Protection Assistance for Overseas Filipino Workers Access Center	121,086	0.37	New	0	0
Adikhaing Tinataguyod ng Kooperatiba	120,361	0.37	−0.60	0	−1
Kasangga sa Kaunlaran	120,042	0.37	−0.36	0	0
Ugnayan ng Maralita Laban sa Kahirapan	118,149	0.36	+0.20	0	0
Disabled/Pilipinos with Disabilities	118,043	0.36	New	0	0
Global Workers and Family Federation	117,552	0.36	New	0	0
Association of Laborers and Employees	112,052	0.35	−0.21	0	0
Cancer Alleviation Network on Care Education and Rehabilitation	109,965	0.34	New	0	0
ACT-CIS Partylist	109,300	0.34	−1.03	0	−1
Aagapay sa Matatanda	102,583	0.32	−0.57	0	−1
Marino Samahan ng mga Seaman	102,430	0.32	New	0	0
Isang Pangarap na Bahay sa Bagong Buhay ng Maralitang Kababayan	100,746	0.31	−0.11	0	0
Movement for Economic Transformation and Righteous Opportunities	94,515	0.29	New	0	0
PISTON Land Transportation Coalition	89,384	0.28	−0.36	0	0
Sanlakas	87,351	0.27	−0.04	0	0
TGP Partylist	87,009	0.27	New	0	0
Kaagapay ng Nagkakaisang Agilang Pilipinong Magsasaka / Kabuhayan at Kabahayan ng mga Magsasaka	79,178	0.24	New	0	0
Migrante Sectoral Party of Overseas Filipinos and their Families	76,523	0.24	+0.05	0	0
Association of Marine Officer and Ratings	68,226	0.21	New	0	0
Isang Alyansang Aalalay sa Pinoy Skilled Workers	65,459	0.20	−0.39	0	0
Sinag Tungo sa Kaunlaran	61,393	0.19	New	0	0
Akbay Kalusugan	56,809	0.18	New	0	0
One Advocacy for Health Progress and Opportunity	54,550	0.17	New	0	0
Ang Pro-Life	53,078	0.16	−0.31	0	0
Sandigan ng mga Manggagawa sa Konstruksyon	52,251	0.16	New	0	0
Tribal Communities Association of the Philippines	50,401	0.16	New	0	0
Union of Nationalist Democratic Filipino Organization	49,742	0.15	New	0	0
Central Luzon Alliance for Socialized Education	49,212	0.15	New	0	0
Tinderong Pinoy Party	46,942	0.14	New	0	0
Partido ng Bayan ang Bida	46,853	0.14	New	0	0
Kapatirang Magmamais ng Pilipinas	46,521	0.14	New	0	0
Guardians Brotherhood	46,182	0.14	New	0	0
Kaisahan ng mga Maliliit na Magsasaka	42,935	0.13	New	0	0
Partido ng Manggagawa	42,742	0.13	New	0	0
Kilos Mamamayan Ngayon Na	39,777	0.12	New	0	0
Federation of International Cable TV and Telecommunications Association of the Philippines	36,619	0.11	New	0	0
Anak Central Party	35,270	0.11	New	0	0
Barangay Natin	31,185	0.10	New	0	0
Ang Tao Muna at Bayan	30,147	0.09	New	0	0
Awareness of Keepers of the Environment	28,727	0.09	New	0	0
National Confederation of Tricycle Operators and Drivers Association of the Philippines	24,407	0.08	New	0	0
Alliance for National Urban Poor Organizations Assembly	18,793	0.06	New	0	0
Movement of Women for Change and Reform	17,040	0.05	New	0	0
1-Abilidad	16,805	0.05	−0.02	0	0
Mamamayan Tungo sa Maunlad na Pilipinas	9,200	0.03	−0.12	0	0
Construction Workers Solidarity	9,121	0.03	New	0	0
DUMPER Partylist	6,941	0.02	New	0	0
Total	32,377,841	100.00	–	59	0
Valid votes	32,377,841	71.98	+3.01		
Invalid/blank votes	12,602,521	28.02	−3.01		
Total votes	44,980,362	100.00	–		
Registered voters/turnout	55,739,911	80.70	+4.93		
Source: COMELEC

Vote share
Ako Bikol	5.14%
GABRIELA	4.22%
1-PACMAN	4.05%
ACT Teachers	3.65%
Senior Citizens	3.05%
Kabayan	2.60%
AGRI	2.58%
PBA	2.41%
Buhay	2.35%
Abono	2.26%
AMIN	2.18%
Coop-NATCCO	2.07%
Akbayan	1.88%
Bayan Muna	1.87%
AGAP	1.83%
An Waray	1.82%
CIBAC	1.72%
AAMBIS-Owa	1.53%
Kalinga	1.53%
A TEACHER	1.47%
YACAP	1.46%
DIWA	1.44%
TUCP	1.44%
Abang Lingkod	1.44%
LPGMA	1.44%
Alona	1.34%
1-SAGIP	1.23%
Butil	1.22%
ACTS-OFW	1.16%
Anakpawis	1.13%
Ang Kabuhayan	1.08%
ANGKLA	1.04%
Mata	1.02%
1-CARE	1.02%
ANAC-IP	0.98%
ABS	0.93%
Kabataan	0.93%
BH	0.92%
AASENSO	0.91%
SBP	0.87%
Magdalo	0.86%
1-ang Edukasyon	0.86%
Manila Teachers	0.83%
Kusug Tausug	0.76%
Aangat Tayo	0.75%
Agbiag!	0.74%
Others	33.30%

Congressional sectoral seats
Ako Bikol	5.08%
GABRIELA	3.39%
1-PACMAN	3.39%
ACT Teachers	3.39%
Senior Citizens	3.39%
Kabayan	3.39%
AGRI	3.39%
PBA	3.39%
Buhay	3.39%
Abono	3.39%
AMIN	3.39%
Coop-NATCCO	3.39%
Akbayan	1.69%
Bayan Muna	1.69%
AGAP	1.69%
An Waray	1.69%
CIBAC	1.69%
AAMBIS-Owa	1.69%
Kalinga	1.69%
A TEACHER	1.69%
YACAP	1.69%
DIWA	1.69%
TUCP	1.69%
Abang Lingkod	1.69%
LPGMA	1.69%
Alona	1.69%
1-SAGIP	1.69%
Butil	1.69%
ACTS-OFW	1.69%
Anakpawis	1.69%
Ang Kabuhayan	1.69%
ANGKLA	1.69%
Mata	1.69%
1-CARE	1.69%
ANAC-IP	1.69%
ABS	1.69%
Kabataan	1.69%
BH	1.69%
AASENSO	1.69%
SBP	1.69%
Magdalo	1.69%
1-ang Edukasyon	1.69%
Manila Teachers	1.69%
Kusug Tausug	1.69%
Aangat Tayo	1.69%
Agbiag!	1.69%
Others	0%

== Aftermath ==
The proclamation of the winners for the party-list election was done on May 19, ten days after election day. Several party-list groups noted certain discrepancies which could affect the distribution of the seats for the party-lists. One of them is Gabriela, which stated that the computation for the total number of seats assigned for party-list was erroneous. In the motion they filed before the Supreme Court, they stated that since 20% of the district representative seats (238) is equal to 59.5, the correct seat total should be 60, not 59. This would allow the Gabriela party-list to gain one seat based on the computation done by the COMELEC.

Another party-list, Ating Guro, noted that there was an error on the computation made by COMELEC in proclaiming the winners of the party-list election. They said that Coop-NATCCO, based on its total number of votes, was entitled to only one seat, but instead COMELEC proclaimed two representatives from the party. Ating Guro claimed that the seat gained by COOP-NATCCO should have been theirs. They filed a petition before the COMELEC on May 23.
