= Mody Floranda =

Filipino transport activist

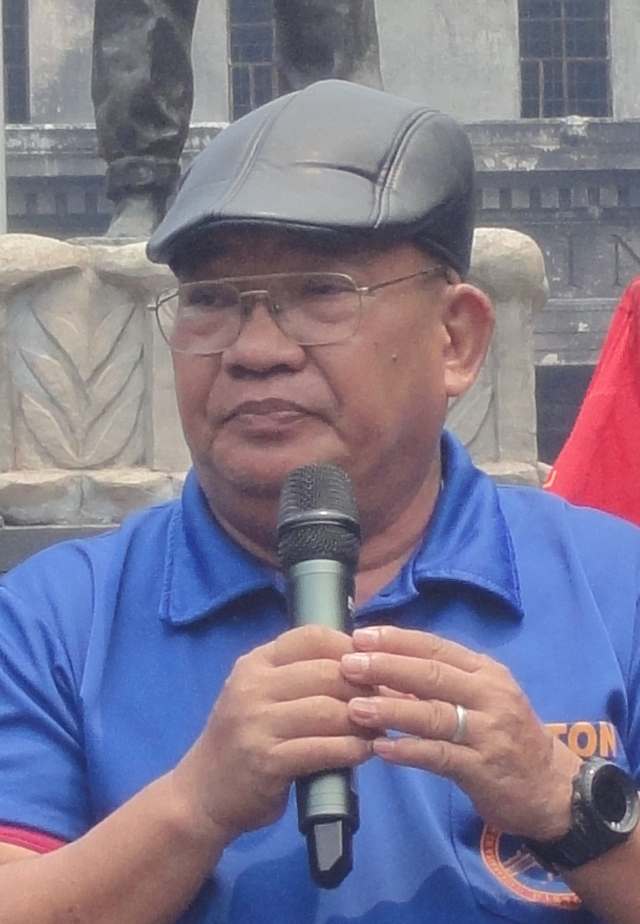
- Floranda at the Senate announcement of Makabayan for the 2025 Philippine general election.

Chairperson of Pagkakaisa ng mga Samahan ng Tsuper at Opereytor Nationwide

Personal details
- Born: Modesto Toque Floranda; November 4, 1965 (age 60) Cavinti, Laguna, Philippines
- Party: Makabayan
- Spouse: Ma. Felicidad Celestina R. Floranda
- Occupation: transport leader, activist
- Website: modyfloranda.com

Modesto "Mody" Toque Floranda (born November 4, 1965) is a Filipino transport activist from the ranks of jeepney and other public utility vehicles drivers who is the President of the militant group Pagkakaisa ng mga Samahan ng Tsuper at Opereytor Nationwide (PISTON). In the 2025 Philippine Senate election, he is running under Makabayan.

== Early life ==
Floranda was born to a farmer and fisherfolk in Cavinti, Laguna.

Under Martial Law, his family experienced hardships and oppression. On September 28, 1972, his family and barrio were taken by the Philippine Constabulary as they were struggling for land against an haciendero. Their house and food were destroyed. Because of these experiences, he joined the movement against dictatorship, although he experienced different kinds of torture under the military.

After the dictatorship, he worked in Metro Manila as an FX driver of the route Cubao-Vito Cruz. This is where he realized the different kinds of oppression of the government against FX and jeepney drivers and operators because of high fines and high prices of gasoline.

== Activism ==
As a transport leader, he has led numerous jeepney drivers and operators' transport strikes and other numerous forms of protests opposing the government's jeepney phaseout program as a form of privatization. He first experienced phaseout when he was an FX driver in 2014.

He advocates for pro-people public transportation system in the Philippines that would be achieved through national industrializaiton which includes support for local manufacturing.

He has also spoken against continuous oil price hikes in the Philippines which is due to the value-added tax (VAT), TRAIN Law, and excise tax where about ₱9,000 is lost from jeepney drivers' monthly income. He and PISTON has slammed oil deregulation (particularly the Oil Deregulation Law or Republic Act No. 8479) and profiteering of oil companies as the reason for oil price hikes.

== 2025 Senate run ==
Floranda was revealed as part of Makabayan Senatoriable slate on National Heroes Day, August 26, 2024. Floranda challenged the electoral system in the Philippines that those that should be questioned are those coming from political dynasties, that poor people running for position must not have doubts cast about them.

== See also ==
- 2017–2019 transport strikes in the Philippines
- 2023–2024 transport strikes in the Philippines
