= PISTON (transport group) =

- Pagkakaisa ng mga Samahan ng Tsuper at Opereytor Nationwide, PISTON Land Transport Coalition
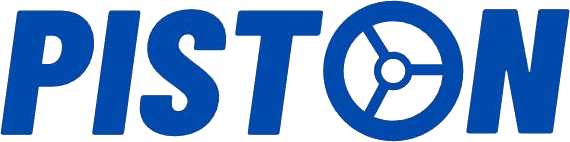
- Logotype
- Formation: 1981; 45 years ago
- Headquarters: Manila
- Location: Philippines
- President: Mody Floranda
- Secretary General: Steve Ranjo
- Affiliations: Kilusang Mayo Uno; Bagong Alyansang Makabayan; ITF; ILPS
- Website: https://pistonph.com

Pagkakaisa ng mga Samahan ng Tsuper at Opereytor Nationwide (lit. 'Solidarity of Drivers and Operators' Organizations Nationwide'), also known by its abbreviation PISTON, is a national federation of public transport associations in the Philippines. It is affiliated with the Philippine trade union center Kilusang Mayo Uno (KMU).

Internationally, PISTON is affiliated with the International Transport Workers' Federation.

== Background ==
PISTON is a national federation of drivers and operators' associations focusing on issues related to the public transportation sector, especially the rights of drivers and operators of public utility vehicles (PUVs) – including jeepneys, taxis, vans, multicabs, tricycles, pedicabs and buses.

Additionally, PISTON aims to promote and advance the basic demands of Filipino transport workers for decent and stable work, livable income, and all their democratic rights.

== History ==
PISTON was established in 1981 upon the consolidation of the Kilusang Mayo Uno's "transportation committee".

In August 1987, PISTON joined KMU in staging nationwide protests against rising petroleum prices, resulting in the arrest of several PISTON members such as president Medardo Roda on sedition charges by the Western Police District (WPD) on August 26. Roda was eventually allowed to post bail a week later upon the ruling of the Supreme Court in his favor. On November 21, 1988, Roda was arrested again on the charge of sedition by WPD superintendent Alfredo Lim after holding a press conference at the National Press Club encouraging PISTON members to join a wildcat transport strike being held nationwide. A day later, the Supreme Court ordered Lim to present Roda before the Manila Regional Trial Court (RTC) judge Felix Barbers and answer accusations that Roda was illegally arrested, but early in the following day, Lim also arrested PISTON secretary general Deogracias Espiritu at his home for the same charges. On November 25, the Supreme Court ordered the WPD to transfer custody of Roda to the National Bureau of Investigation (NBI), then headed by lawyer and activist Jesus Antonio Carpio, and to present Espiritu before RTC judge Barbers. By April 1990, Roda was sentenced to four to six years in prison for inciting to sedition, but was released on bail pending his appeal. Later that year, however, Roda would be arrested two more times for his participation in further protests.

== As a partylist organization ==
PISTON
- Political position: Left
- National affiliation: Makabayan
- Colors: Blue, Red, Yellow
- Sector represented: Public transport drivers and operators

PISTON has attempted in the past to have partylist representation in the House of Representatives.

They have applied to take part in the 2013 election. The Commission on Election unanimously approved their application since they have established that they are representing drivers. However the candidacy was subject to a disqualification case due to allegedly violating campaign posters rules and was barred from getting seats in the legislature.

The petition was ruled "defective for the lack of specificity" and PISTON was eventually allowed to take part in the 2016 election. They did not win a seat. They were disqualified for the 2019 election, due to failure to win a seat in the past two elections.

=== Electoral performance ===
Election	Votes	%	Party-list seats
2013	174,976	0.63%	0 / 58
2016	89,384	0.28%	0 / 59

== Activism ==
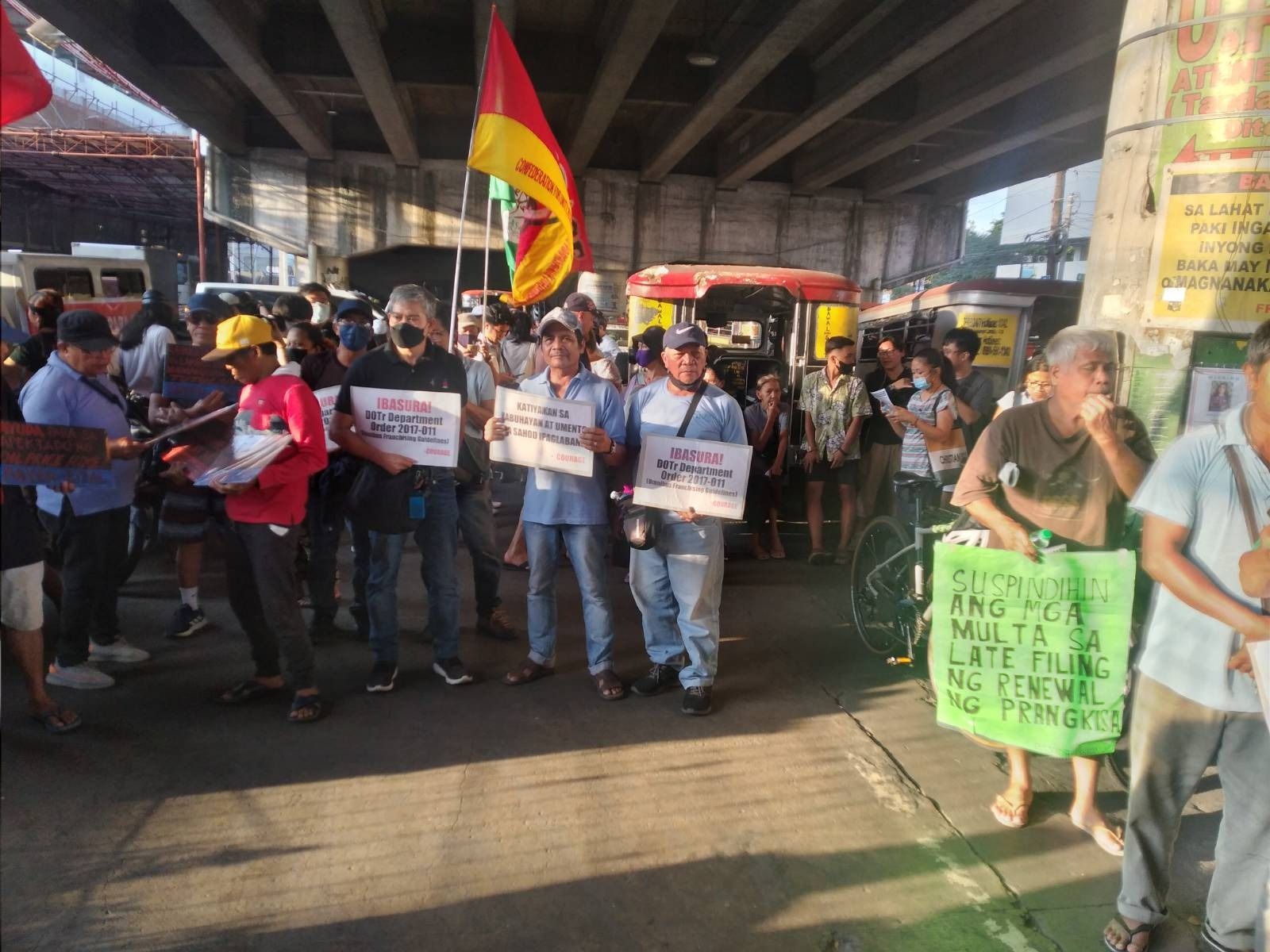
No To Jeepney Phaseout Mobilization, 2023

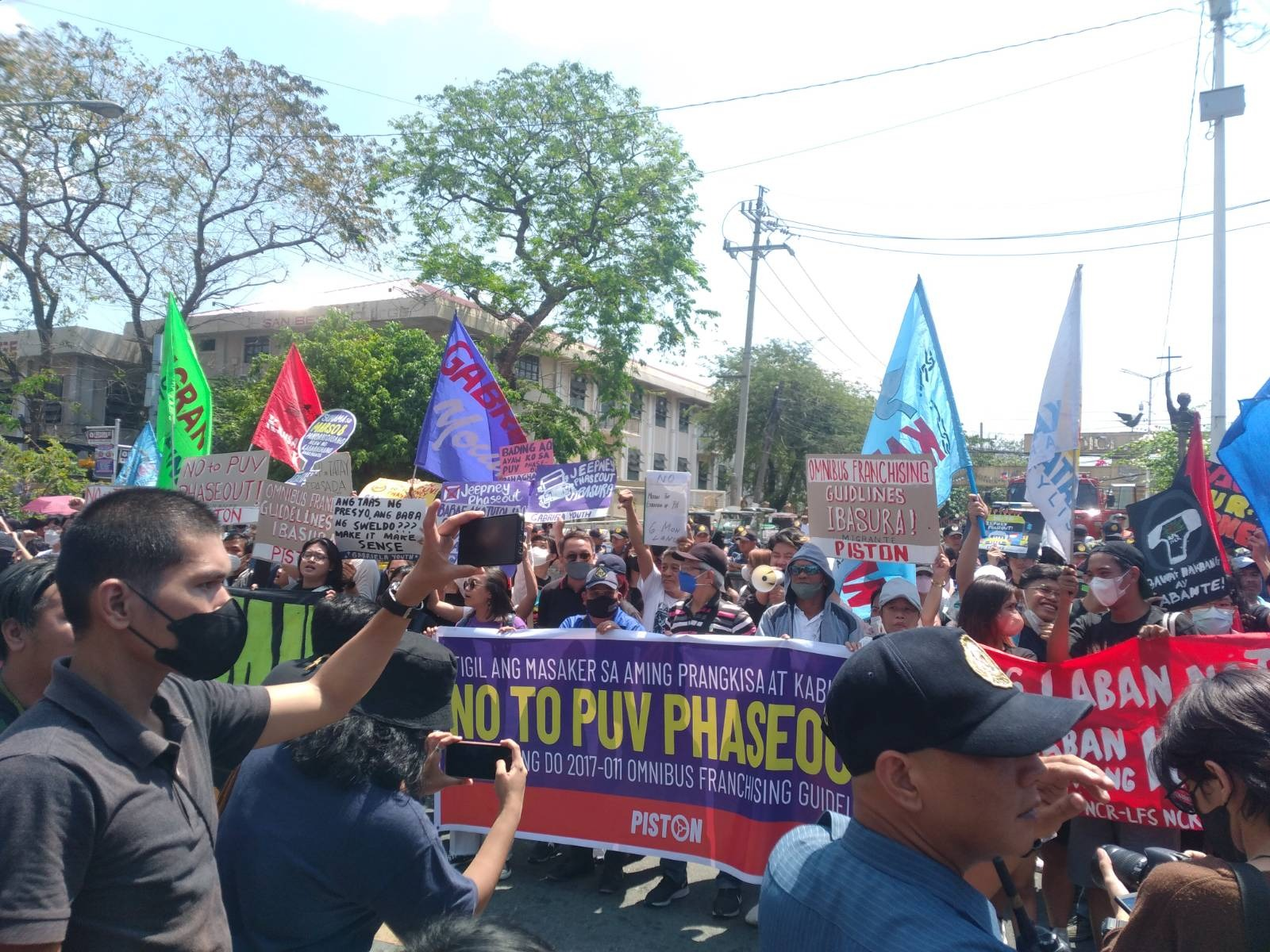
PISTON participating in a protest against the Public Utility Vehicle Modernization Program. March 6, 2023.

In 2013, PISTON launched a campaign directed to the Philippines' main petroleum companies, Petron, Shell, and Chevron to condemn against an oil price hike. They have also urged the abolishment of the Oil Deregulation Law in 2015.

They have also opposed the mandatory phaseout of old vehicles under the Public Utility Vehicle Modernization Program. They had participated in strikes in protest of the program in 2015, 2017 to 2019 and 2023. In 2024, Manibela joined PISTON in the Labour Day protest against the government’s jeepney modernization program.

On September 18, 2025, amid the flood control projects scandal in the Philippines, PISTON staged a nationwide strike to protest growing government corruption, explaining how floods result in a loss of livelihood and additional expenses for jeepney drivers and their families.

=== Legal issue ===
On April 19, 2024, the demurrer to evidence filed by Piston officer Ruben Baylon Severino Ramos, Wilson Ramilla, Ramon Paloma, Elmer Cordero, and Arsenio Ymas - "Piston 6" was granted by Caloocan City Metropolitan Trial Court Branch 83 Presiding Judge Marlo Bermejo Campanilla. The acquittal of the 6 stemmed from their arrest for conducting a peaceful protest near Monumento Circle in Caloocan on June 2, 2020, during COVID-19 community quarantines in the Philippines. They were charged with simple "Resistance or Disobedience" under Article 151 of the Revised Penal Code.

On May 14, 2024, the Supreme Court of the Philippines, instead of issuing a TRO, required the defendants Department of Transportation and the Land Transportation Franchising and Regulatory Board to answer within 10 days, the April 29 temporary restraining order-supplemental petition of PISTON. On the Public Utility Vehicle Modernization Program, the Court further required submission of status updates on consolidating PUV franchises on a per-route basis, on the Local Public Transport Route Plan per locality and the Route Rationalization Plan, and the hearings before the House of Representatives, said Supreme Court spokesperson Attorney Camille Sue Mae L. Ting.

== List of presidents and secretaries general ==
=== President ===
- Medardo Roda (1981–2002)
- Mar Garvida (2002–2007)
- Steve Ranjo (2007–2012)
- George F. San Mateo (2012–2019)
- Modesto "Mody" Floranda (2019–present)

==== Vice president ====
- Rolando Mingo (2007–2012)

=== Secretary general ===
- Deogracias Espiritu (1980s)
- Steve Ranjo (–2007; 2012–present)
- George F. San Mateo (2007–2012)

==== Deputy secretary general ====
- Joel Ascutia (2007–2011)
- Ruben Baylon (2019–present)
