= Protests against Bongbong Marcos =

Protests against the President of the Philippines

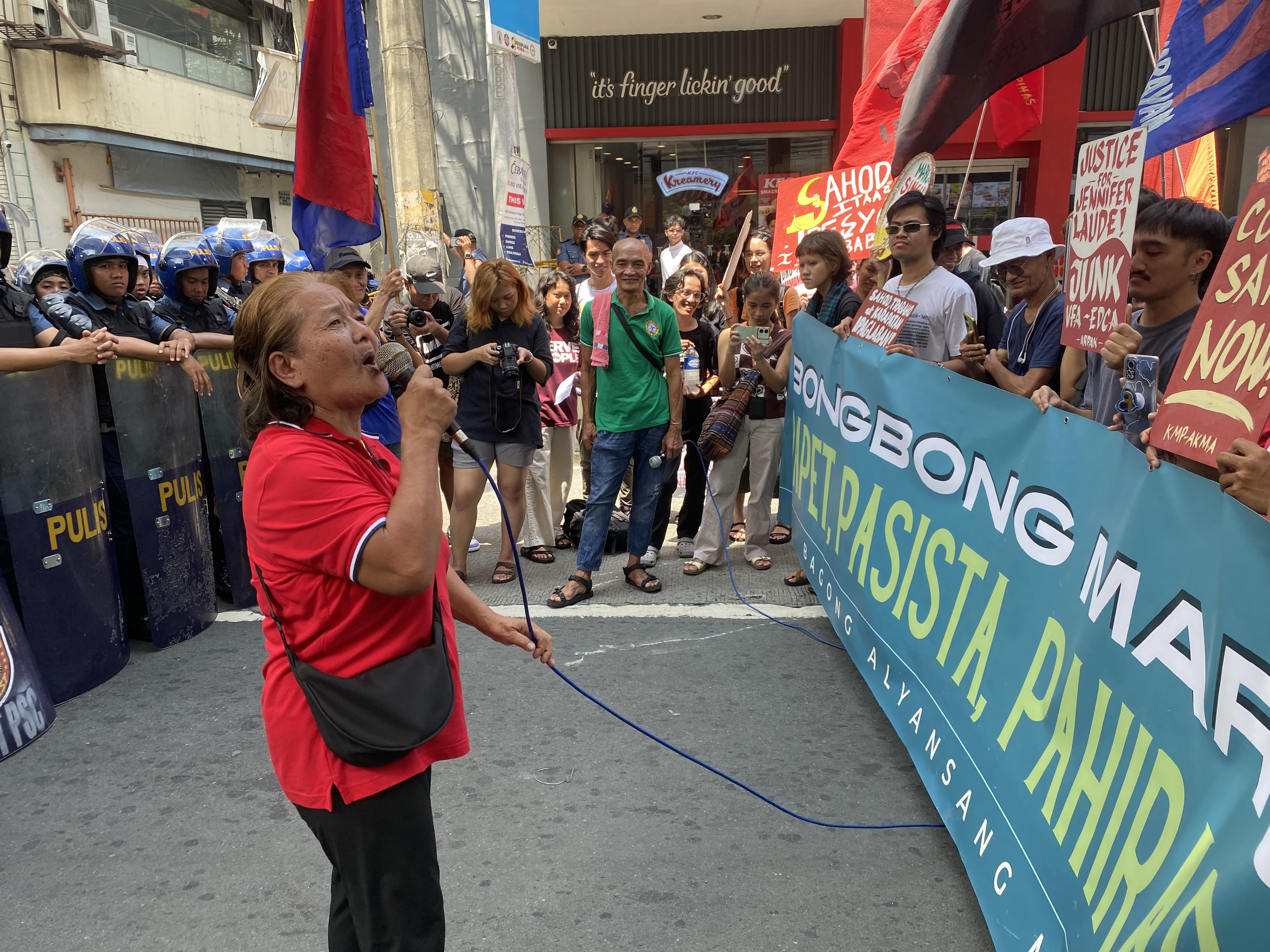
- Protest during third anniversary of Bongbong Marcos presidency
- Date: October 5, 2021–present (5 years and 1 day)
- Location: Philippines and International (Note: Outside of the Philippines, protests have taken place in the United States, Canada, Australia, and various other countries.)
- Caused by: Legacy of former presidents Ferdinand Marcos and Rodrigo Duterte; Historical distortion regarding Ferdinand Marcos; Bongbong Marcos's presidency; Human rights violations in the Philippines and associated extrajudicial killings; Proposals to revise or amend the 1987 Constitution; Arrest of Rodrigo Duterte (since 2025); Censorship; Government corruption; Flood control projects controversy (since 2025)
- Methods: Demonstrations, sit-ins, internet activism, vandalism, picketing, student walk-outs, and strikes

Recently, President Bongbong Marcos marked the 52nd anniversary of the declaration of Martial Law in the Philippines, a period that remains highly controversial in the nation's history. In response, numerous Filipinos gathered in protest near Malacañang Palace, expressing their opposition to the Marcos family's legacy and the lasting impact of Martial Law on Filipino society. Tragically, the demonstration escalated into violence, leading to deaths and injuries. The unrest drew stark comparisons to the regime of the current president's father, former President Ferdinand Marcos, whose time in power was also marred by human rights abuses and violent repression during Martial Law. Protests have been mostly conducted by progressive and opposition groups due to the violent and plunderous legacy of the Marcos family during the martial law era and throughout the rule of his father, former President Ferdinand Marcos; unpaid real-estate taxes; alleged electoral fraud during the 2022 presidential elections; instances of fake news and historical distortion; cases of human rights violations such as extra-judicial killings and the continuing war on drugs; and other social issues. Protests against the president have also included grievances against Vice President Sara Duterte as well as seeking of accountability from his predecessor Rodrigo Duterte. Mobilizations have also been held by Filipino-Americans and other solidarity and progressive groups abroad such as in United States, Australia, and Canada.

Former President Duterte and his supporters have also organized protests against Marcos. In a "prayer rally" held in Cebu City, the former president made numerous remarks denouncing Marcos' People's Initiative and the subsequent economic constitutional amendments. During the rally, Duterte also made statements alluding to the deposal of President Marcos similar to his father yet through military force. In the same rally, Duterte called President Marcos a drug addict, Marcos responded that Duterte's use of fentanyl impaired his judgement. Duterte has since softened his position yet states that he and his coalition are no longer allies with President Marcos, reinforced by Vice President Sara Duterte stating that the UniTeam alliance was dissolved immediately after the 2022 Philippine General Election.

== Causes of the protests ==
=== Ferdinand Marcos's legacy ===
Groups and individuals have expressed dissent and have protested against Marcos Sr.'s legacy on human rights, historical distortion, corruption, poverty, foreign debt, among many other issues. Groups and veteran activists slammed the order of the Malacañang to declare the birthday of Marcos, Sr. as holiday in the home province of Ilocos Norte.

Various groups, such as ecumenical youth group Student Christian Movement of the Philippines (SCMP), have protested against the historical distortion of the legacy of Marcos, Sr. For SCMP, Marcos, Jr. ran "under a massive disinformation campaign, full of lies, and historical distortion" of Marcos, Sr.'s legacy.

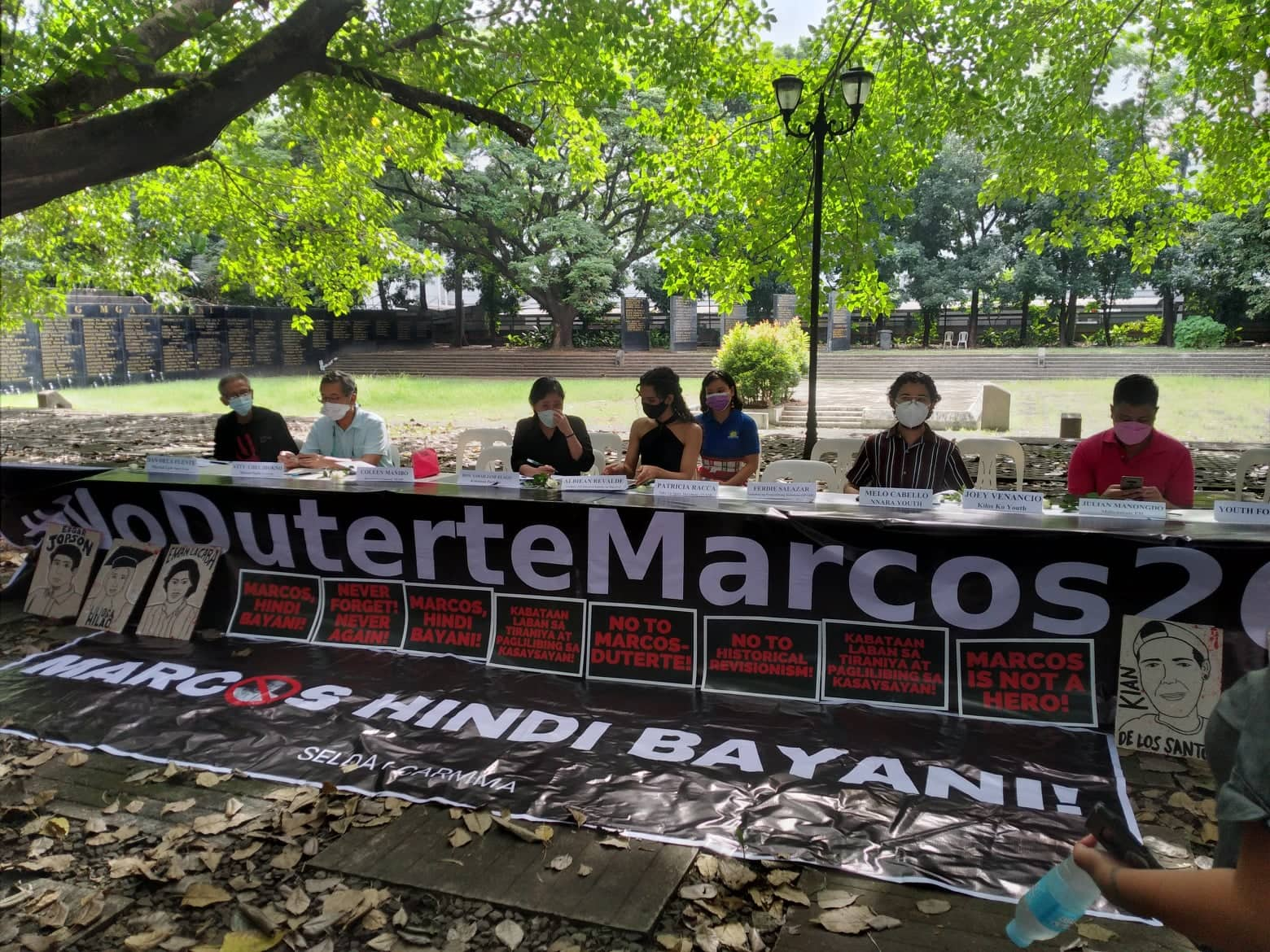
Press conference "No to Duterte Marcos 2022" with Chel Diokno and Sarah Elago present.

=== Rodrigo Duterte's legacy ===
Opposition leaders such as former senatorial candidate Elmer "Bong" Labog and other groups have urged Marcos, Jr. not to be the successor to Duterte's legacy. Numerous groups have also protested to urge the government to hold former Rodrigo Duterte accountable for war on drugs and other violations of human rights. During the lightning rally of University of the Philippines Students on July 31, 2022, students chanted calls to reject Marcos and Duterte.

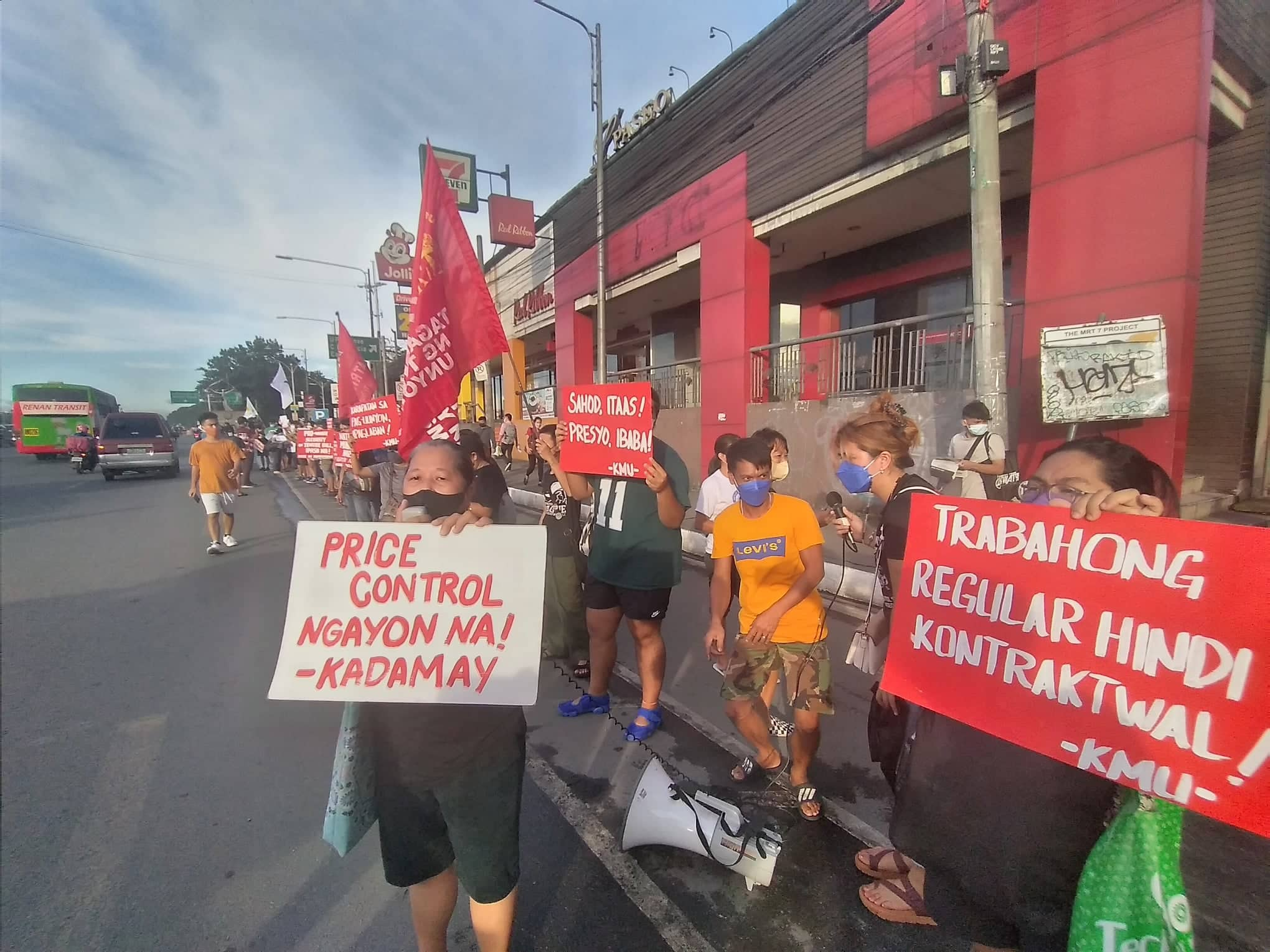
Protesters asserting for price control, lower prices, wage increase, and regularization of work.

=== Economic conditions ===
Numerous economic conditions have prompted many groups to stage protests against the administration. Conditions such as poor working situations of farmers and workers, corruption, lack of aid, low wages, high prices, jeepney modernization, maltreatment of health workers, and many more have prompted many groups to protest on many occasions.

=== Human rights ===
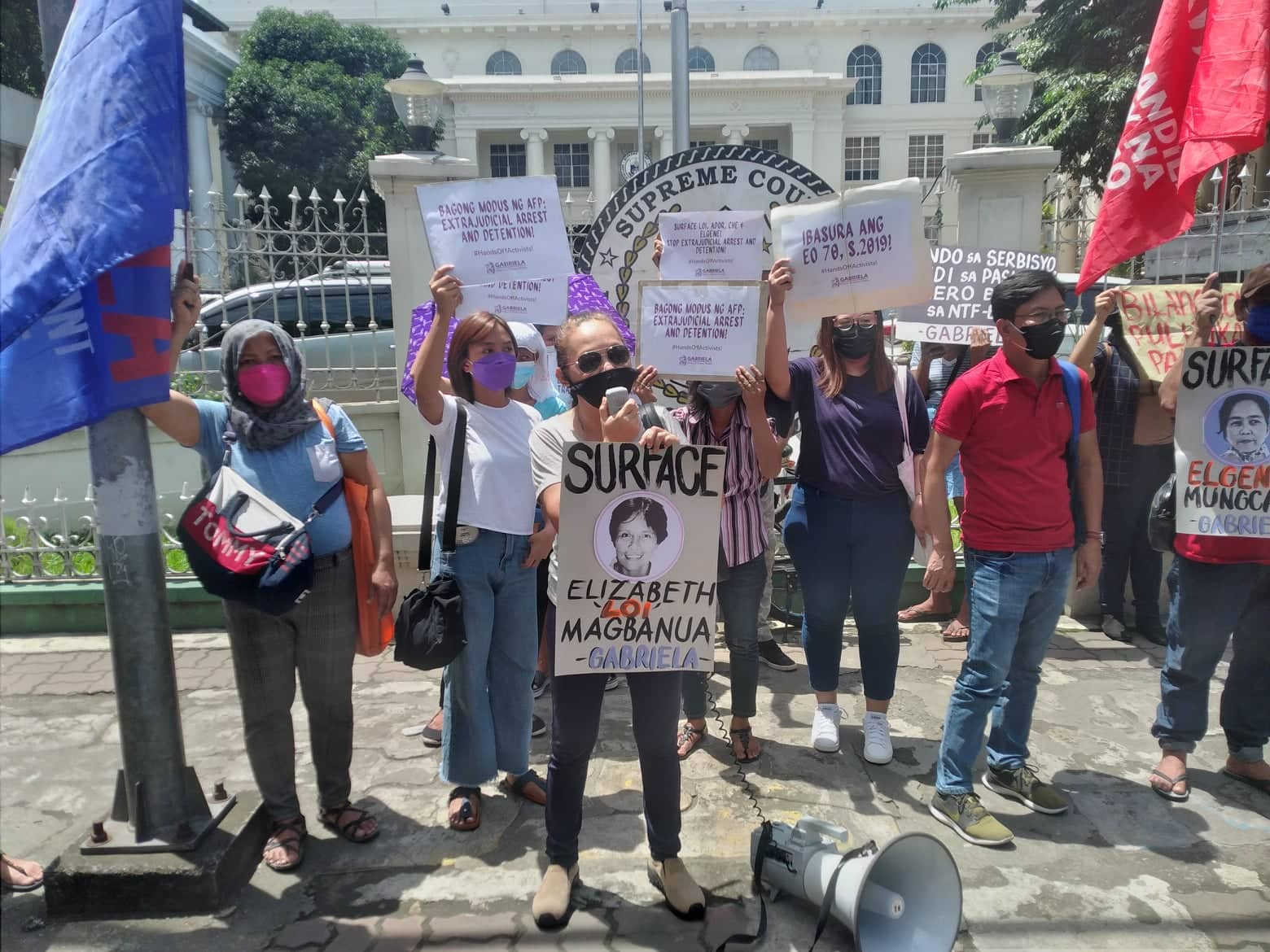
Ruth Manglalan speaks in front of the Supreme Court for a writ of amparo as a measure to surface her partner, missing activist Loi Magbanua.

On August 10, 2022, groups such as Kilusang Mayo Uno, GABRIELA, and SCMP conducted a mobilization in front of Supreme Court in support of the loved ones and colleagues of missing activists as they urged the issuance of writ of amparo. The activists, Loi Magbanua, Ador Juat, Elgene Mungcal, and Cha Pampoza, have been believed to be abducted by government forces and being held in a military camp. Similar groups earlier protested in front of Camp Aguinaldo in July to call to "surface" the said missing activists.

=== Constitutional reforms ===
Efforts to revised or amend the constitution was also opposed with the Makabayan group organizing protest against it. They argue that proposed economic changes by the Congress are a prelude to the introduction of political amendments including changes on term limits.

Former president Rodrigo Duterte and his supporters have also organized separate demonstrations against the Marcos administration. Duterte has alleged that Marcos' allies in the Congress are seeking term extensions for the president's benefit. However Duterte has expressed openness to back economic-related changes.

== Events ==
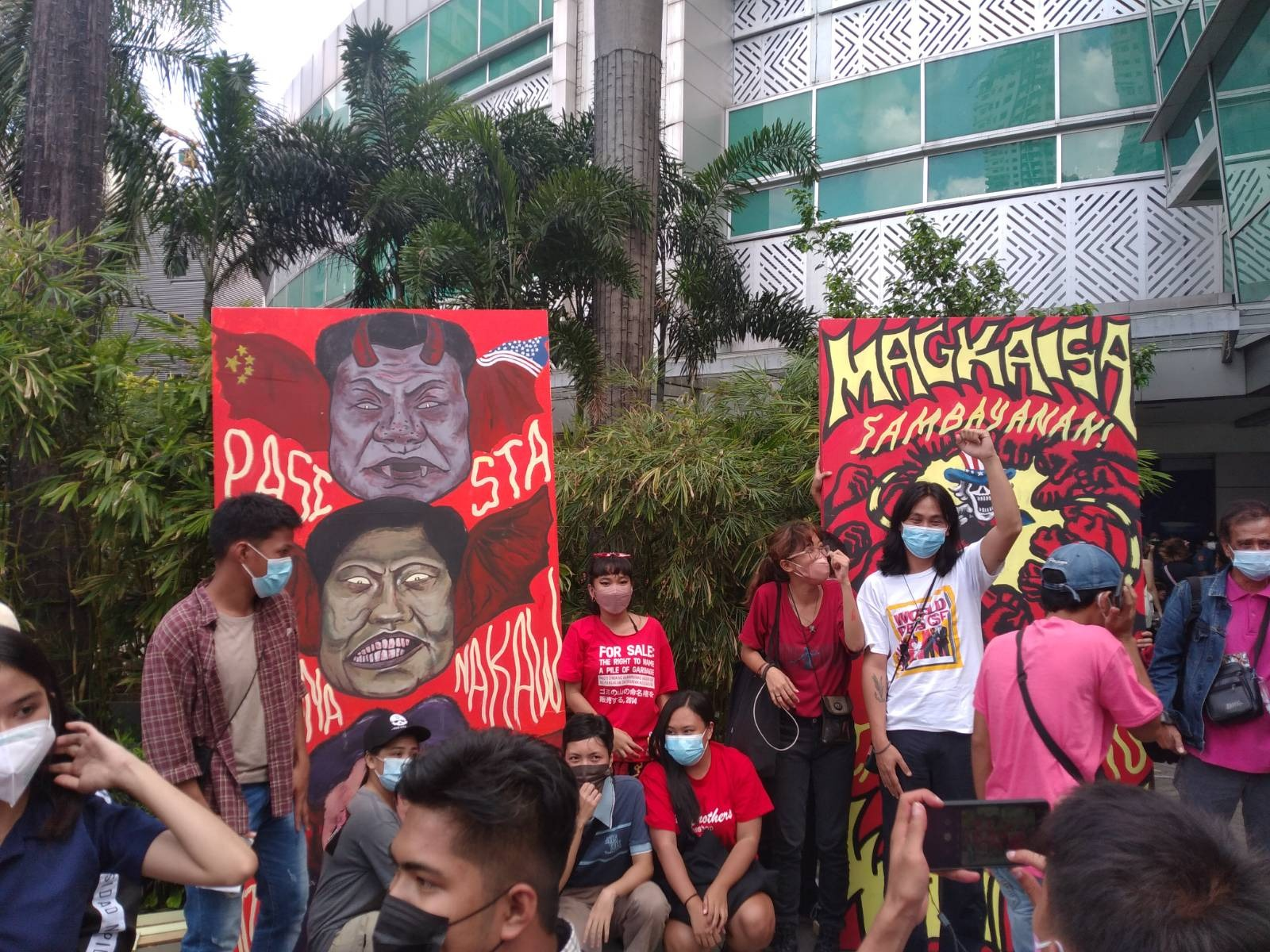
An anti-Marcos-Duterte effigy during a Team Robredo–Pangilinan rally at the Araneta Center in Quezon City, February 25, 2022.

=== 2022 presidential elections ===
Numerous groups have expressed their opposition to the candidacy of Bongbong Marcos even before the filing of candidacy. In October 2021, protesters burned an effigy of Marcos, Sr. outside the Commission on Human Rights. Karapatan leader Tinay Palabay said that Bongbong's candidacy is like "de ja vu", "a slap on the faces of the victims of the widespread torture, rapes, and disappearances."

In November 2021, the Cordillera Peoples Alliance and the Campaign Against the Return of the Marcoses and Martial Law gathered around the bust of Ferdinand Marcos in Benguet and unveiled banners bearing the words "Marcos No Hero", "The North Resists", and "No to Duterte Marcos 2022".

The campaign of Leni Robredo for presidency and its accompanying gatherings and protests have also included calls against the restoration of the Marcoses. Robredo said that Bongbong Marcos's candidacy became a factor why she pushed her candidacy for presidency. She voiced her concerns against fake news, disinformation, corruption, and plunder, referring to the legacy of the Marcoses. During the 2016 elections, she successfully ran for vice president against Marcos, Jr. to stop the return of the Marcoses.

On February 25, 2022, several groups protested against Marcos' candidacy as they commemorated the anniversary of the People Power Revolution in EDSA.

On May 10, several groups protested in front of the COMELEC main office at the Palacio del Gobernador in Intramuros. They alleged massive electoral fraud, citing reports of 1,800 defective or malfunctioning VCMs, the voters being asked to leave their ballots at the precinct for mass feeding after some VCMs broke down, and the fast transmission of results. Protesters were reportedly chanting "Marcos, Magnanakaw!" (lit. 'Marcos, Thief!'), a chant popularized during the 1980s. Meanwhile, the Office of the Student Regent of the University of the Philippines called on their students to walk out, announcing that there will be "no classes under a Marcos presidency."

=== Inauguration day ===
June 30, 2022, was the inauguration of the new Marcos administration, held at the National Museum of Fine Arts in Manila. The Philippine National Police did not allow the protests to be near the venue and only gave permission for protests among Freedom Parks. Leftist group Bagong Alyansang Makabayan (BAYAN) held their protest at the Plaza Miranda. At the day of the inauguration, SCMP, in protest, successfully forwarded a resolution to the 37th World Student Christian Federation General Assembly in Berlin entitled "Denounce Rodrigo Duterte for His Crimes Against Humanity and Resist the Newly-Installed Marcos-Duterte Regime".

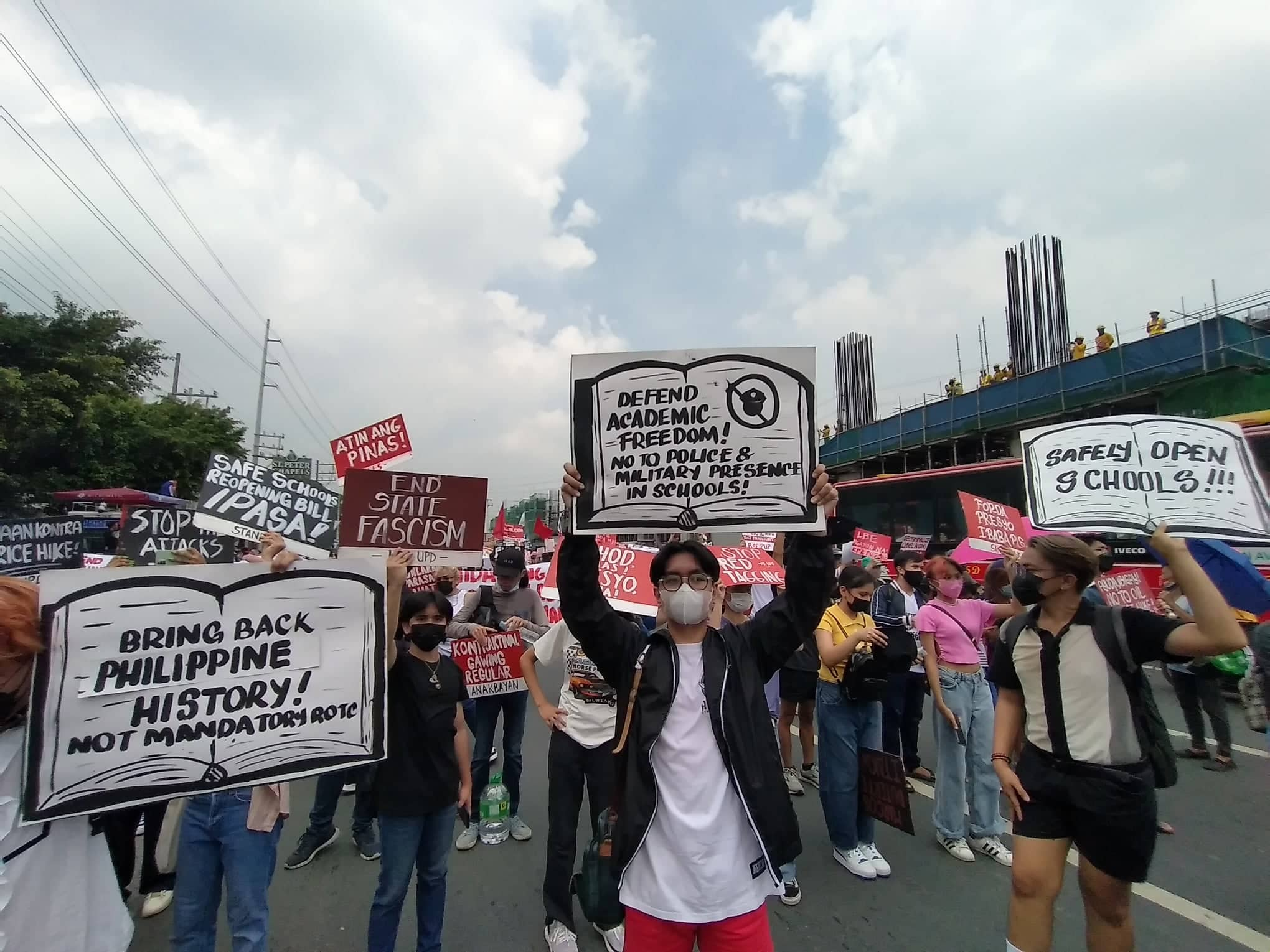
Students rally for education rights during the SONA 2022.

=== State of the Nation Address 2022 ===
Before the actual speech of the president, numerous opposition groups marched along Commonwealth Avenue to protest against the administration of Marcos, Jr. Progressive groups in other cities such as in Cebu, Baguio, and Davao held anti-SONA protests dubbed as "People's SONA". Groups such as BAYAN challenged the administration to the demands of marginalized groups.

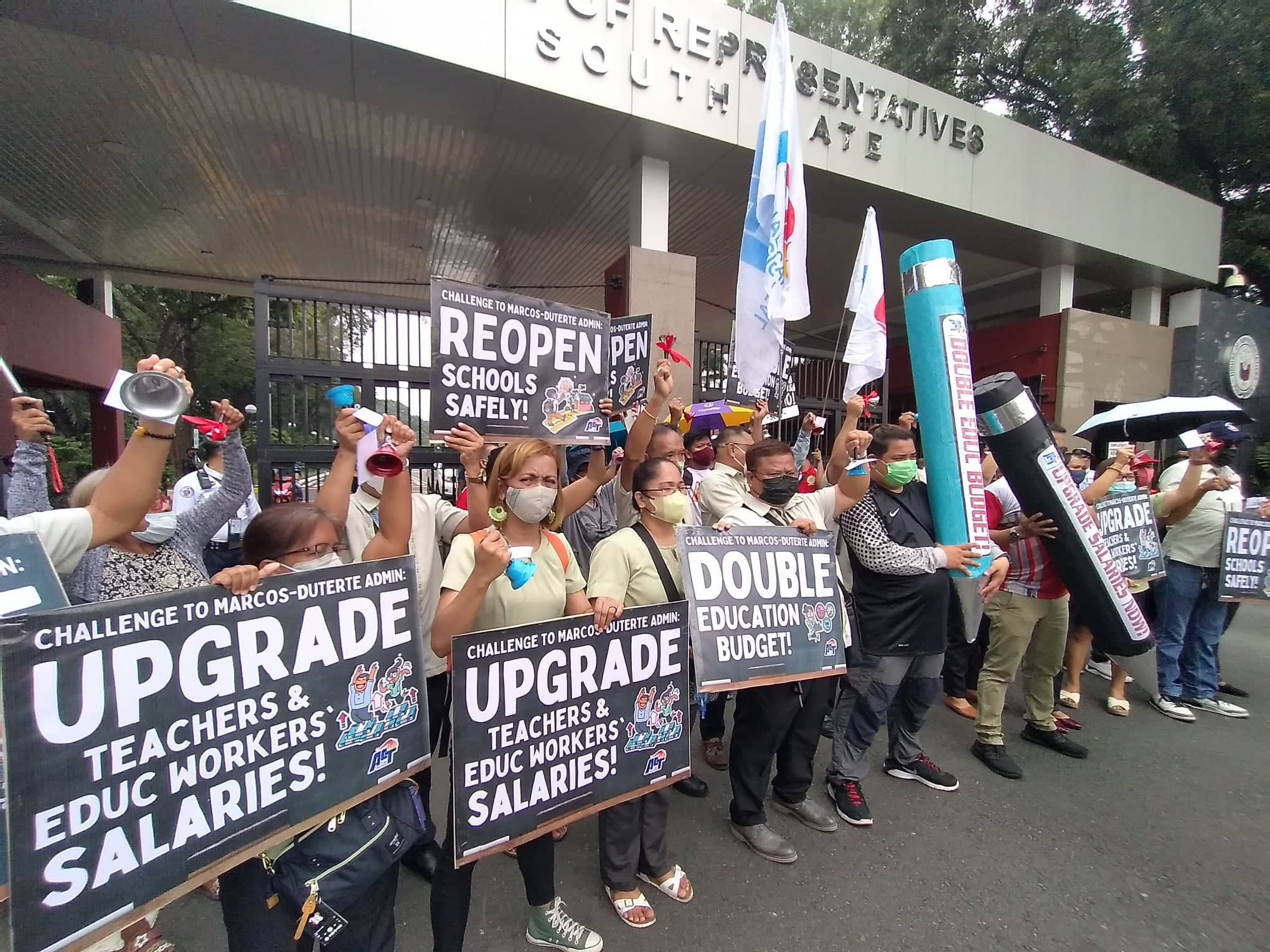
ACT Teachers demanding higher salary in front of the Congress.

=== Deliberations for the 2023 national budget ===
Numerous groups have protested outside Batasang Pambansa regarding the budget deliberations for 2023 fiscal year. ACT Teachers protested for higher teaching allowance. Youth group Anakbayan protested against budget cuts.

== Protests outside the Philippines ==
Protests outside the Philippines against the Marcos, Jr. administration have been conducted by sympathetic Filipinos in diaspora and of other nationalities in solidarity with the situation of Filipinos. On the day of the inauguration, Filipino activists from Anakbayan, International League of Peoples' Struggle, and other groups marched on Times Square and the Philippine Consulate General in New York. On the day of SONA 2022, activists in New York protested against the regime. They have also called to prosecute former President Duterte. Concurrent protests also occurred in Chicago, Honolulu, Houston, Los Angeles, Phoenix, Portland, San Francisco, Seattle, and Washington, D.C.

SONA 2022 protests were also held in Toronto, Canada, headed by Anakbayan, while in Australia, mobilizations were mounted in Sydney, Melbourne, and Perth.

== Response of authorities to the protests ==
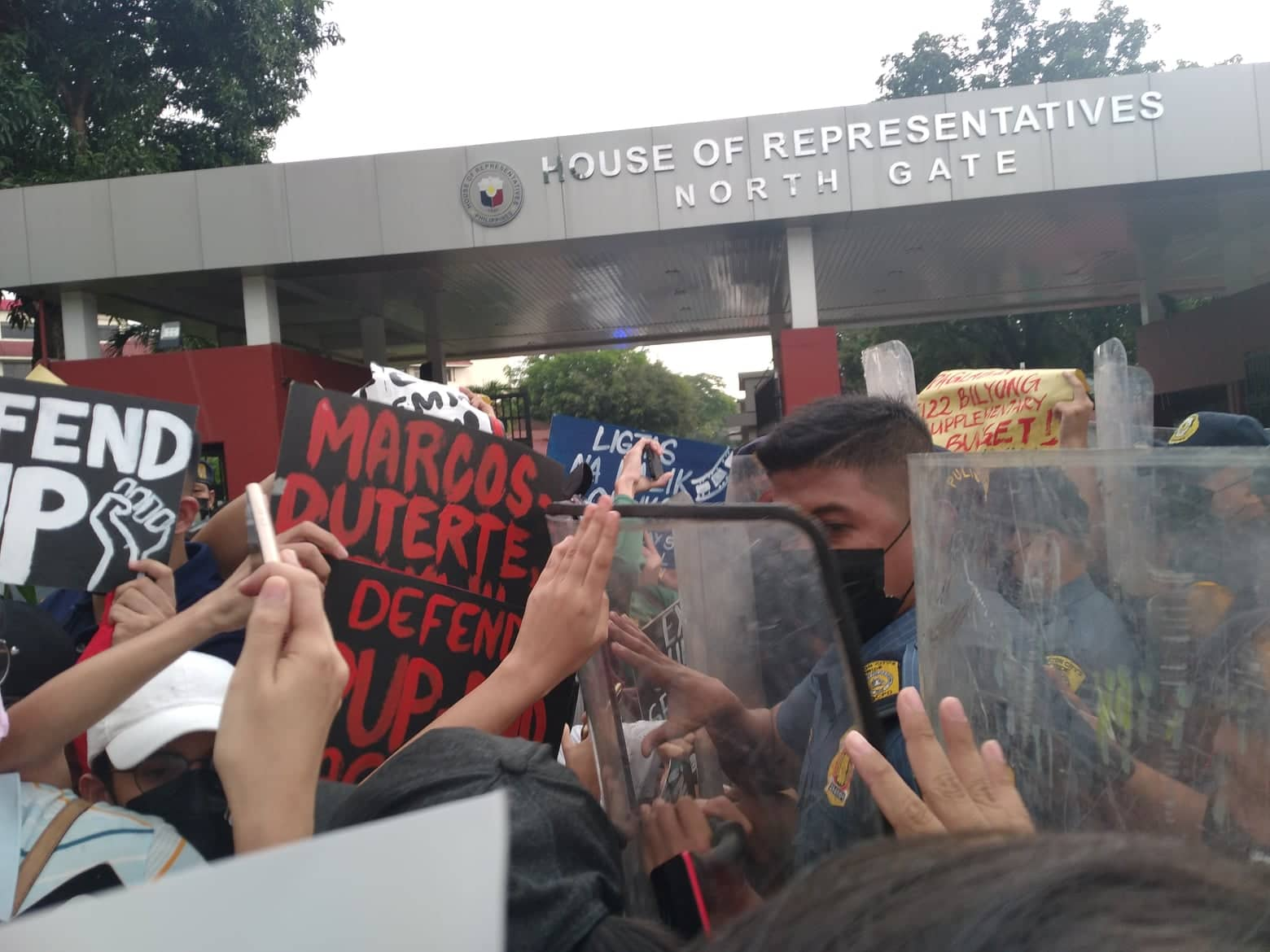
On September 9, 2022, the police dispersed youth activists who were against budget cuts in education.

On numerous occasions, police forces have faced the protesters and have sometimes dispersed them.

Groups such as BAYAN have denounced the Philippine National Police (PNP) against the ban on SONA rallies during the day of SONA as the PNP allowed a pro-Marcos rally near Batasang Pambansa. Militant groups were able to rally along Commonwealth Avenue because of the intervention of the Quezon City local government, thanking mayor Joy Belmonte. After the SONA 2022 protest in Davao, police forces nabbed two Lumad youth, Mawing and Ismael Pangadas, who were protesting for their rights. KAPATID, a support organization for political prisoners condemned the arrests after such protest in a "Freedom Park". The police said that the Lumad youth were arrested because of human trafficking. They said that they were the "first victims of trumped-up politically motivated cases under the Marcos-Duterte administration." They also condemned Vice President and former Davao City mayor Sara Duterte for the "irony" of her parading in Lumad-Bagobo attire during SONA 2022 as she ordered the closure of Lumad schools in the past.

On August 22, 2022, the police dispersed NGOs such as Salinlahi in their distribution of face masks and school supplies for the first day of classes while advocating for safe resumption of classes. The groups condemned the dispersal as "illegal" and a "chilling effect of the Anti-Terror Law". The police claimed that they did not have a permit and that the groups were causing disorder, with their distribution activity inciting fear among children and parents and causing traffic. However, a video showed that the police confiscated the donation and placards in front of children and parents, as well as a police gripping one of the NGO members by their neck.

In September 2022, ACT Teachers slammed the police forces that halted their mobilization in front of Batasang Pambansa despite securing protest permit from the local government unit. Their protest was in order to lobby to Congress representatives for a bill to increase their teaching allowance. According to the group's chairperson Vladimer Quetua, "they don’t deserve this disrespect and censorship on their right to free speech".

On September 9, 2022, youth and student groups were dispersed by the policies for protesting against budget cuts in front of Batasang Pambansa.

== See also ==
- 2025–2026 Philippine anti-corruption protests
- Noynoying
- 2001 Philippines EDSA People Power Revolution
- 1986 Philippines EDSA People Power Revolution
- Efforts to impeach Gloria Macapagal Arroyo

=== Protest against other presidents ===
- Protests against Rodrigo Duterte (timeline)
- Protests against Donald Trump (timeline)
- Protests against Prabowo Subianto
- Protests against Emmanuel Macron
  - Yellow vests movement
