= 2013 Philippine House of Representatives party-list election =

Elections were held for seats reserved for the party-list representation in the House of Representatives of the Philippines on May 13, 2013. At most 10% of the seats in the House of Representatives of the Philippines are reserved for party-list representatives. The election was via the party-list system, with a 2% "soft" election threshold via the Hare quota, except that no party can win more than 3 seats, and if the seats won do not reach the 20% of the seats of the entire House of Representatives, the parties that have yet to win seats will get a seat each until the 20% reserved for party-lists have been filled up.

== Party-list purge ==
The Commission on Elections (Comelec) purged the parties participating in the party-list election from almost 200 parties in the 2010 election to just over 100. However, most of the disqualified party-lists successfully got restraining orders from the Supreme Court to retain their names on the ballot. On April 6, 2013, the Supreme Court changed its earlier ruling on what are the criteria set for joining in the party-list election to a more liberal interpretation. With this, the court gave back the cases of the disqualified parties to the Comelec for consideration under the new interpretation.

== Raffle ==
The Comelec also raffled the parties on the order that they will appear on the ballot. This is to avoid parties using numbers or the letter "A" as the first letter of their party to be seen first by the voter.

== Nominees ==
The Comelec released the list of nominees of every party that appeared on the ballot.

== Results ==
Party	Votes	%	+/–	Seats	+/–
Buhay Hayaan Yumabong	1,270,608	4.59	+0.33	3	+1
A Teacher Partylist	1,042,863	3.77	+1.66	2	0
Bayan Muna	954,724	3.45	+0.90	2	0
1st Consumers Alliance for Rural Energy	934,915	3.38	+0.75	2	0
Akbayan	829,149	2.99	−0.62	2	0
Abono	768,265	2.77	+0.16	2	0
Ako Bicol Political Party	763,316	2.76	−2.44	2	−1
OFW Family Club	752,229	2.72	New	2	New
Gabriela Women's Party	715,250	2.58	−0.84	2	0
Coalition of Association of Senior Citizens in the Philippines	679,168	2.45	−1.96	2	0
Cooperative NATCCO Network Party	642,005	2.32	−0.90	2	0
Agricultural Sector Alliance of the Philippines	592,463	2.14	+0.38	2	+1
Citizens' Battle Against Corruption	584,906	2.11	−0.11	2	0
Magdalo para sa Pilipino	567,426	2.05	New	2	New
An Waray (Note: An Waray was initially entitled to two seats following the 2013 election. However after a re-computation ordered by the Supreme Court it was determined that An Waray only secured one seat. Victoria Noel assumed position as An Waray's second representative without a proclamation from the Commission on Elections.)	541,205	1.95	−0.47	1	−1
Abante Mindanao	466,114	1.68	+0.40	1	0
ACT Teachers	454,346	1.64	+0.37	1	0
Butil Farmers Party	439,557	1.59	−0.14	1	0
Anak Mindanao	382,267	1.38	+0.83	1	New
Anti-Crime and Terrorism Community Involvement and Support	377,165	1.36	+1.37	1	New
Kalinga-Advocacy for Social Empowerment and Nation-Building Through Easing Poverty	372,383	1.34	−0.56	1	0
LPG Marketers Association	370,897	1.34	−0.09	1	0
Trade Union Congress Party	369,286	1.33	+0.50	1	0
You against Corruption and Poverty	366,621	1.32	+0.18	1	0
Agri-Agra na Reforma para sa Magsasaka ng Pilipinas Movement	366,170	1.32	+1.16	1	New
Angkla: Ang Partido ng mga Pilipinong Marino	360,497	1.30	New	1	New
Arts Business and Science Professionals	359,587	1.30	+0.42	1	0
Democratic Independent Workers Association	341,820	1.23	+0.42	1	0
Kabataan	341,292	1.23	−0.19	1	0
Anakpawis	321,745	1.16	−0.37	1	0
Alay Buhay Community Development Foundation	317,355	1.15	+0.59	1	0
Ang Asosasyon Sang Mangunguma Nga Bisaya-Owa Mangunguma	312,312	1.13	−0.09	1	0
Social Amelioration & Genuine Intervention on Poverty	287,739	1.04	New	1	New
Alliance of Volunteer Educators	270,431	0.98	+0.24	1	0
Adhikaing Tinataguyod ng Kooperatiba	267,763	0.97	+0.37	1	0
Abang Lingkod	260,923	0.94	+0.83	1	New
1 Banat & Ahapo Coalition	245,529	0.89	New	1	New
Abakada Guro	244,754	0.88	+0.56	1	New
Ang Mata'y Alagaan	244,026	0.88	+0.67	1	New
Ang Nars	243,360	0.88	New	1	New
Ang National Coalition of Indigenous Peoples Action Na	241,505	0.87	New	1	New
Agbiag! Timpuyog Ilocano	240,841	0.87	−0.03	1	0
Append	236,353	0.85	+0.86	1	New
Ang Laban ng Indiginong Filipino	223,857	0.81	+0.03	0	−1
Ating Guro	214,080	0.77	New	0	0
Puwersa ng Bayaning Atleta	212,298	0.77	−0.11	0	−1
Aangat Tayo	207,855	0.75	+0.14	0	−1
Kasangga sa Kaunlaran	202,456	0.73	−0.28	0	−1
Bagong Henerasyon	190,001	0.69	−0.31	0	−1
Kapatiran ng mga Nakulong na Walang Sala	175,096	0.63	−0.17	0	−1
Piston Land Transport Coalition	174,976	0.63	New	0	0
Bayani	165,906	0.60	+0.34	0	0
Aksyon Magsasaka-Partido Tinig ng Masa	165,784	0.60	+0.04	0	0
Agrarian Development Association	164,702	0.59	+0.50	0	0
Isang Alyansang Aalalay sa Pinoy Skilled Workers	162,552	0.59	New	0	0
Abante Retirees Partylist Organization	161,915	0.58	+0.59	0	0
Katribu Indigenous Peoples Sectoral Party	153,844	0.56	+0.17	0	0
Association of Laborers and Employees	153,616	0.55	+0.56	0	0
1 Joint Alliance of Marginalized Group	153,072	0.55	−0.25	0	0
Action Brotherhood for Active Dreamers	150,854	0.54	−0.03	0	−1
Veterans Freedom Party	148,591	0.54	−0.01	0	0
Association of Philippine Electric Cooperatives	146,392	0.53	−0.54	0	−1
Pasang Masda Nationwide	134,944	0.49	+0.37	0	0
Una ang Pamilya	131,954	0.48	−0.26	0	−1
Alyansa ng mga Grupong Haligi ng Agham at Teknolohiya para sa Mamamayan	130,694	0.47	−0.36	0	−1
Ang Prolife	129,989	0.47	New	0	0
Pilipino Association for Country-Urban Poor Youth Advancement and Welfare	123,791	0.45	−0.04	0	0
1-United Transport Koalisyon	123,489	0.45	−0.30	0	−1
Isang Lapian ng Mangingisda at Bayan Tungo sa Kaunlaran	119,505	0.43	New	0	0
Isang Pangarap ng Bahay sa Bagong Buhay ng Maralitang Kababayan	117,516	0.42	+0.43	0	0
Akap Bata Sectoral Organization for Children	116,837	0.42	+0.05	0	0
Abante Katutubo	111,625	0.40	+0.31	0	0
Firm 24-K Association	103,316	0.37	+0.04	0	0
Alyansang Bayanihan ng mga Magsasaka Manggagawang Bukid at Mangingisda	102,021	0.37	−0.10	0	0
Ang Ladlad Lgbt Party	100,958	0.36	−0.02	0	0
Ang Agrikultura Natin Isulong	94,651	0.34	+0.14	0	0
Kasosyo Producer-Consumer Exchange Association	93,581	0.34	−0.27	0	−1
1 Bro-Philippine Guardians Brotherhood	88,603	0.32	New	0	0
Pilipinos with Disabilities	87,247	0.32	New	0	0
Sanlakas	86,854	0.31	New	0	0
Abante Tribung Makabansa	86,145	0.31	−0.20	0	0
Ako Ayoko sa Bawal na Droga	81,378	0.29	−0.02	0	0
Adhikain ng mga Dakilang Anak Maharlika	80,398	0.29	+0.06	0	0
Association for Righteousness Advocacy in Leadership	77,206	0.28	+0.14	0	0
Katipunan ng mga Anak ng Bayan All Filipino Democratic Movement	76,838	0.28	−0.29	0	0
Sectoral Party ang Minero	71,534	0.26	+0.12	0	0
Action League of Indigenous Masses	67,807	0.24	−0.06	0	0
Ating Agapay Sentrong Samahan ng mga Obrero	65,119	0.24	New	0	0
1-A Action Moral & Values Recovery Reform Philippines	65,095	0.24	+0.22	0	0
Aagapay sa Matatanda	59,844	0.22	+0.21	0	0
1 Guardians Nationalist of the Philippines	58,406	0.21	−0.20	0	0
Adhikain at Kilusan ng Ordinaryong Tao para sa Lupa Pabahay Hanapbuhay at Kaunlaran	51,806	0.19	+0.01	0	0
Migrante Sectoral Party of Overseas Filipinos and Their Families	51,431	0.19	New	0	0
Alyansa ng OFW Party	51,069	0.18	−0.13	0	0
Ugnayan ng Maralita Laban sa Kahirapan	45,492	0.16	New	0	0
Alliance for Rural Concerns	45,120	0.16	−0.04	0	0
Alliance of Bicolnon Party	44,324	0.16	−0.03	0	0
Blessed Federation of Farmers and Fishermen International	43,829	0.16	−0.05	0	0
Alliance of Advocates in Mining Advancement for National Progress	42,853	0.15	−0.01	0	0
Advance Community Development in New Generation	42,819	0.15	New	0	0
Alliance for Rural and Agrarian Reconstruction	41,257	0.15	−0.35	0	0
United Movement against Drug Foundation	41,023	0.15	+0.05	0	0
Association of Marine Officer & Ratings	40,955	0.15	New	0	0
Mamamayan Tungo sa Maunlad na Pilipinas	40,218	0.15	New	0	0
Anti-War/Anti-Terror Mindanao Peace Movement	39,206	0.14	+0.01	0	0
Green Force for the Environment Sons and Daughters of Mother Earth	30,581	0.11	−0.04	0	0
Agila ng Katutubong Pilipino	29,739	0.11	−0.25	0	0
Alyansa ng Media at Showbiz	28,263	0.10	+0.04	0	0
Alagad	27,883	0.10	−0.68	0	−1
Alliance for Philippines Security Guards Cooperative	27,400	0.10	+0.04	0	0
Kababaihang Lingkod Bayan sa Pilipinas	24,369	0.09	−0.09	0	0
1-Abilidad	21,900	0.08	+0.07	0	0
Alyansa Lumad Mindanao	19,381	0.07	+0.01	0	0
Total	27,687,240	100.00	–	58	+3
Valid votes	27,687,240	68.97	−9.91		
Invalid/blank votes	12,456,967	31.03	+9.91		
Total votes	40,144,207	100.00	–		
Registered voters/turnout	52,982,173	75.77	+1.43		
Source: COMELEC tally winning parties 1 2 3; Supreme Court: Abang Lingkod, Senior Citizens
