= Office of Transportation Cooperatives =

- Tanggapan ng mga Kooperatibang Pantransportasyon

Agency overview
- Formed: May 28, 1983; 43 years ago
- Headquarters: Quezon Avenue, Barangay Paligsahan, Quezon City
- Employees: 38 (2024)
- Agency executives: Atty. Teofilo E. Guadiz III, CESO V, Chairman; (Vacant), Executive Director
- Parent agency: Department of Transportation
- Website: www.otc.gov.ph

The Office of Transportation Cooperatives (OTC; Filipino: Tanggapan ng mga Kooperatibang Pantransportasyon) is a government agency of the Philippines mandated to promulgate and implement rules and regulations that governs the promotion, organization, regulation, supervision, registration through accreditation and development of transportation cooperatives which are subject to the approval of the Department of Transportation. It is created through Executive Order No. 898, signed by then President Ferdinand Marcos on May 28, 1983.

OTC is headed by a chairman and an executive director. The office is further subdivided into the Administrative & Finance Division, Operations Division, and Planning & Evaluation Division.
