= Public Utility Vehicle Modernization Program =

Modernization of public transportation in the Philippines

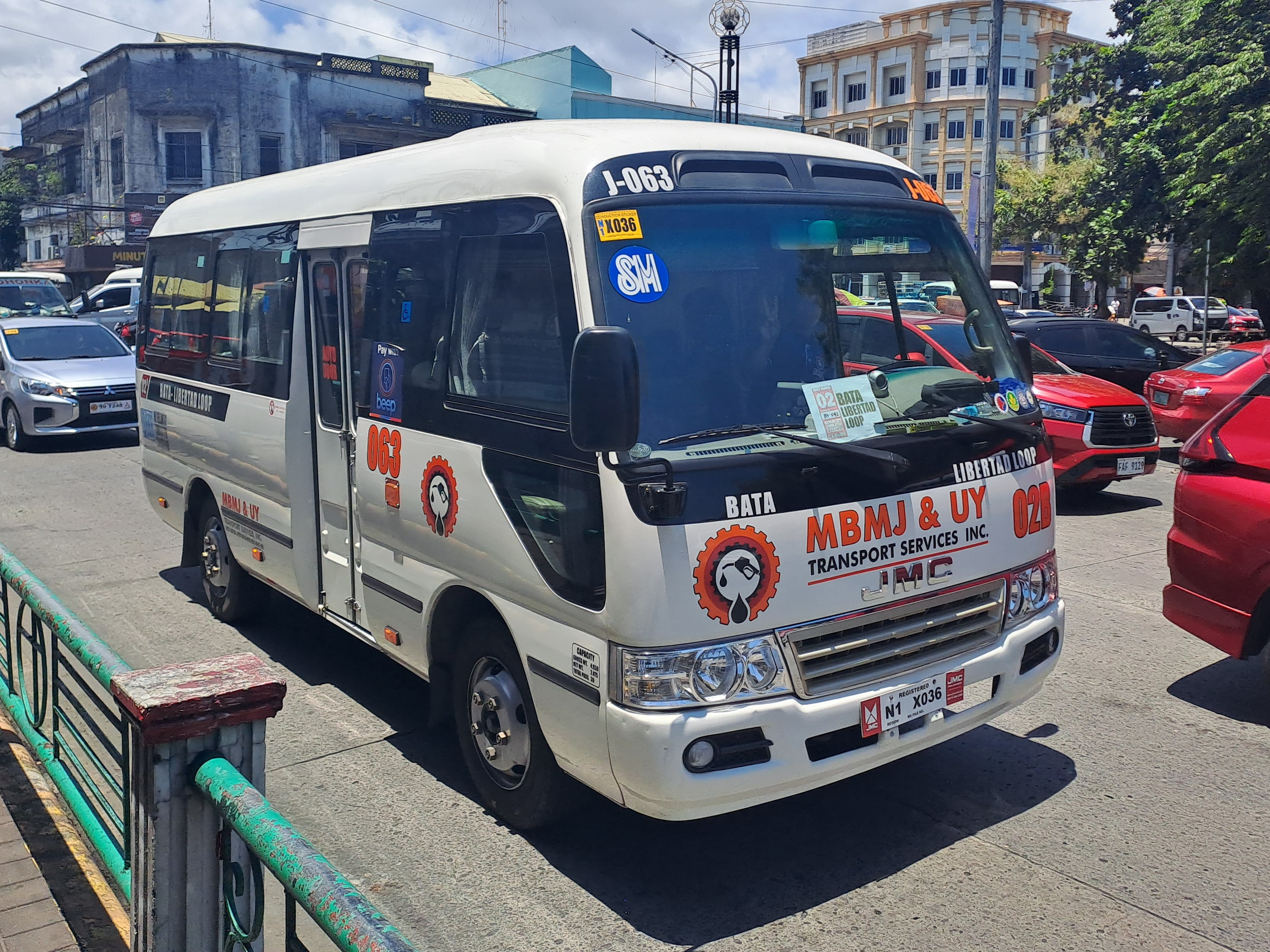
- A modern jeepney in Bacolod
- Date: 2017–present
- Type: Transportation program
- Cause: Safety and environmental concerns
- Target: Phase-out and replacement of all PUVs 15 years or older Formation or Participation of Transport Cooperatives
- Budget: ₱2.2 billion
- Organized by: President Rodrigo Duterte; Transportation Secretary Arthur Tugade

The Public Transport Modernization Program (PTMP), formerly and still commonly referred to as the Public Utility Vehicle Modernization Program (PUVMP) or simply the PUV modernization program, is a program launched by the Department of Transportation (DOTr) in 2017 with the goal of making the Philippines' public transportation system more efficient and environmentally friendly by 2020. The program calls for the phaseout of jeepneys, buses, and other public utility vehicles (PUVs) that are at least 15 years old and their replacement with safer, more comfortable, and more environmentally friendly alternatives. At the time of the program's inception, around 220,000 jeepneys were operating throughout the country. The program also requires PUV drivers and operators to join or form transport cooperatives.

Replacement vehicles are required to use at least a Euro 4–compliant engine or an electric motor to reduce pollution. Proposed features include CCTV cameras, an automated fare collection system, speed limiters, and GPS monitoring systems.

The Land Bank of the Philippines estimated that each jeepney replacement unit would cost around ₱2.4 million to ₱2.6 million. However, Senator Grace Poe stated that, based on a 6% annual interest rate and a seven-year payment period, the actual cost of a replacement jeepney could reach ₱2.1 million.

While the program has generally received positive reception from the public, some transport groups have criticized it, arguing that it could result in job and business losses.

== Goals ==
The program aims to change the current franchising system, revise and introduce new routes and provide education to jeepney drivers.

The program, according to the DOTr, has the following goals:

- Safe and comfortable transport,
- Reliable travel time,
- Disciplined and competent drivers,
- Fair regulations,
- Spacious jeepneys.

Moreover, the government believes that the program's environmental and economic benefits would be felt by commuters, operators, and drivers alike: commuters will profit from the changes in routes and optimized networks. Because of the reduced traffic congestion and pollution, drivers will have higher monthly pay and benefits, as well as better health. Finally, with less traffic, operators will be able to take more passengers and save money under the franchising plan by pooling services.

== Implementation ==
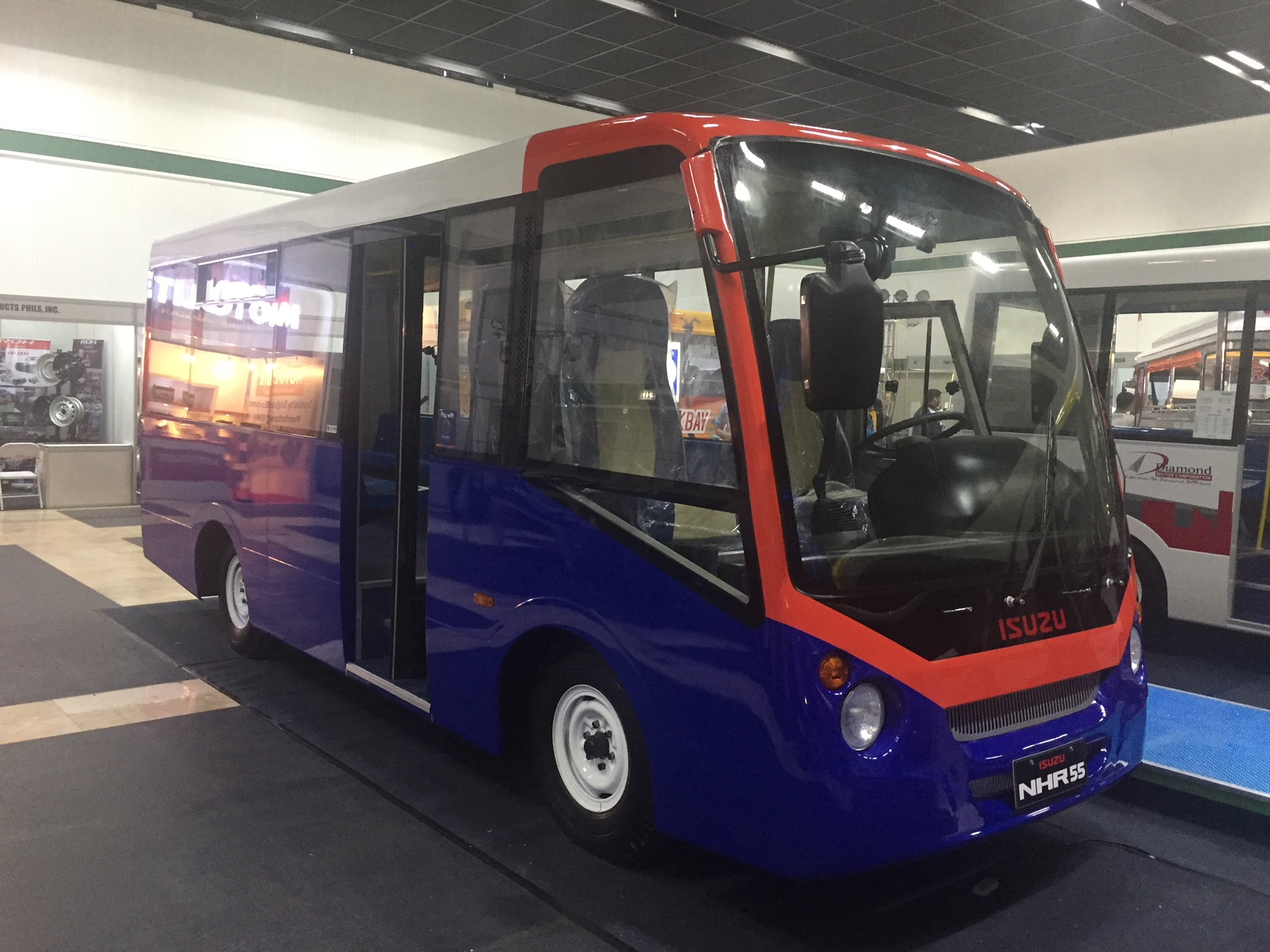
A prototype of a Class II Modernized Jeepney from Isuzu coachbuilt by Almazora Motors.

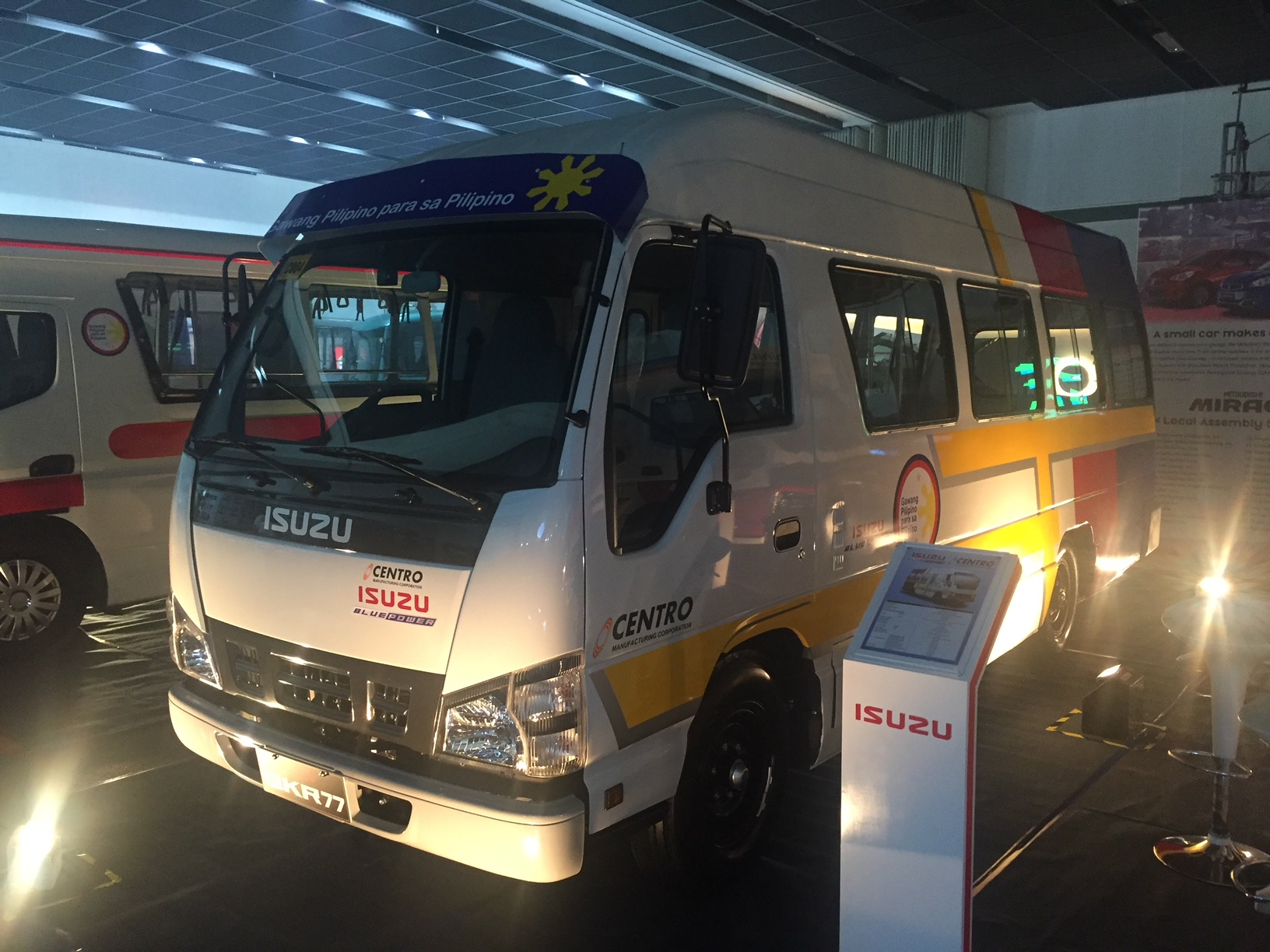
An Isuzu QKR77 Class II Jeepney prototype by Centro

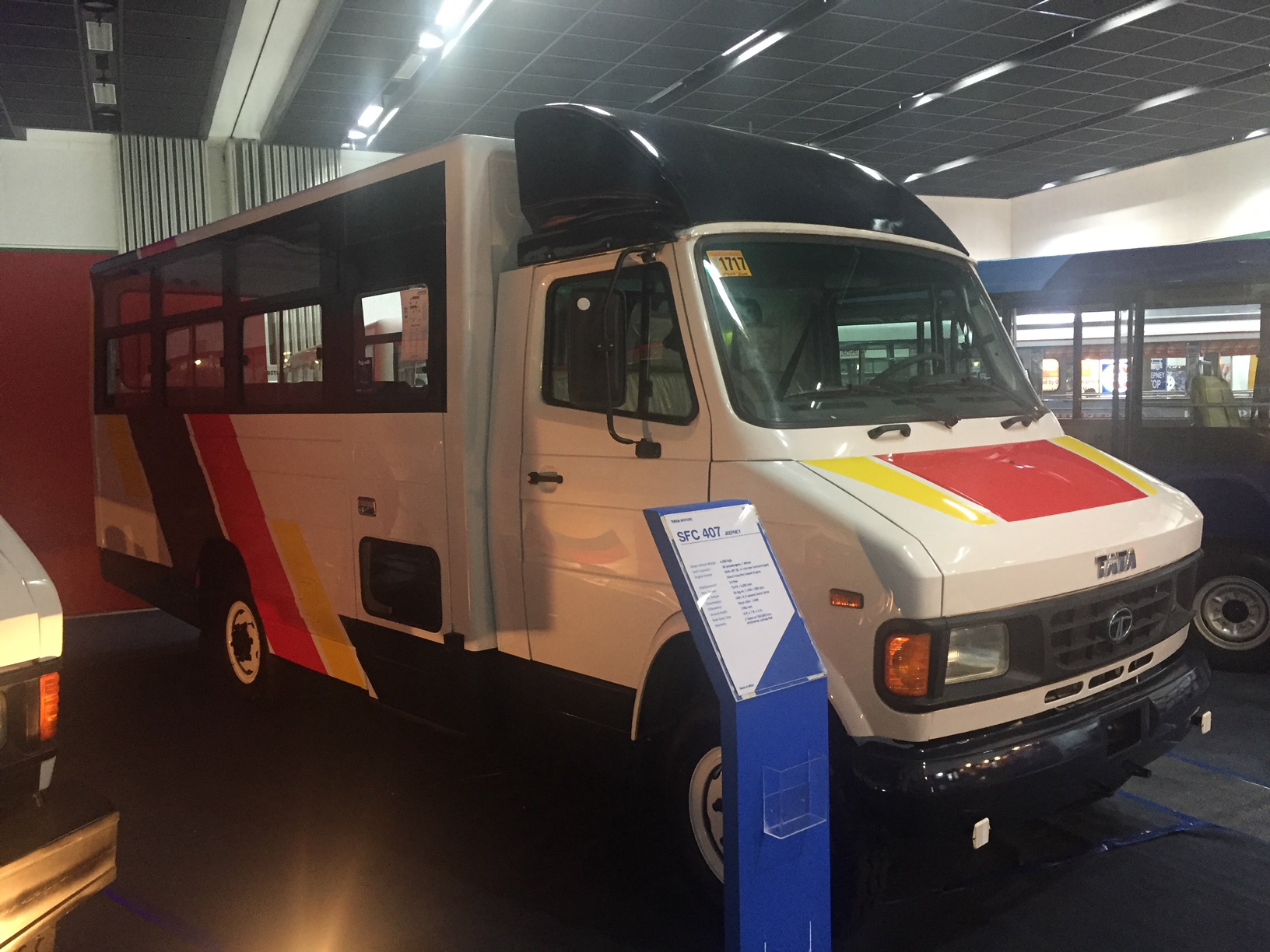
A Tata 407 Modernized Jeepney

The Omnibus Franchising Guidelines (OFG) were signed by Transportation Secretary Arthur Tugade in June 2017, and they altered the process of issuing jeepney franchises by implementing new route planning criteria and establishing new vehicle and driver standards.

Under the OFG, Local Government Units are required to come up with their own Local Public Transport Route Plans.

These plans will be based on existing and projected travel patterns and will be considered by the Land Transportation Franchising and Regulatory Board in issuing new franchises. Single-unit operators will no longer be granted franchises.

=== Crackdown on dilapidated vehicles ===
In January 2018, Metro Manila's Inter-Agency Council on Traffic (i-ACT) launched operation 'Tanggal Bulok, Tanggal Usok', targeting vehicles for environmental and safety violations such as smoke belching, worn out tires and lack of seat belts. As of January 23, a total of 1087 vehicles, mostly Public Utility Jeepneys (PUJs), were flagged down, apprehended and issued summons. To accommodate affected passengers, the Armed Forces of the Philippines offered free rides.

=== Prototypes ===
In October 2017, the Land Transportation Franchising and Regulatory Board (LTFRB) and the Department of Trade and Industry (DTI) presented sixteen prototype jeepneys. These models were all locally manufactured and based on guidelines set by the DOTr. Features include:

- Euro 4 engines
- CCTV Cameras
- GPS
- Automated fare collection systems
- Front-facing seats
- New exits on the right-hand side

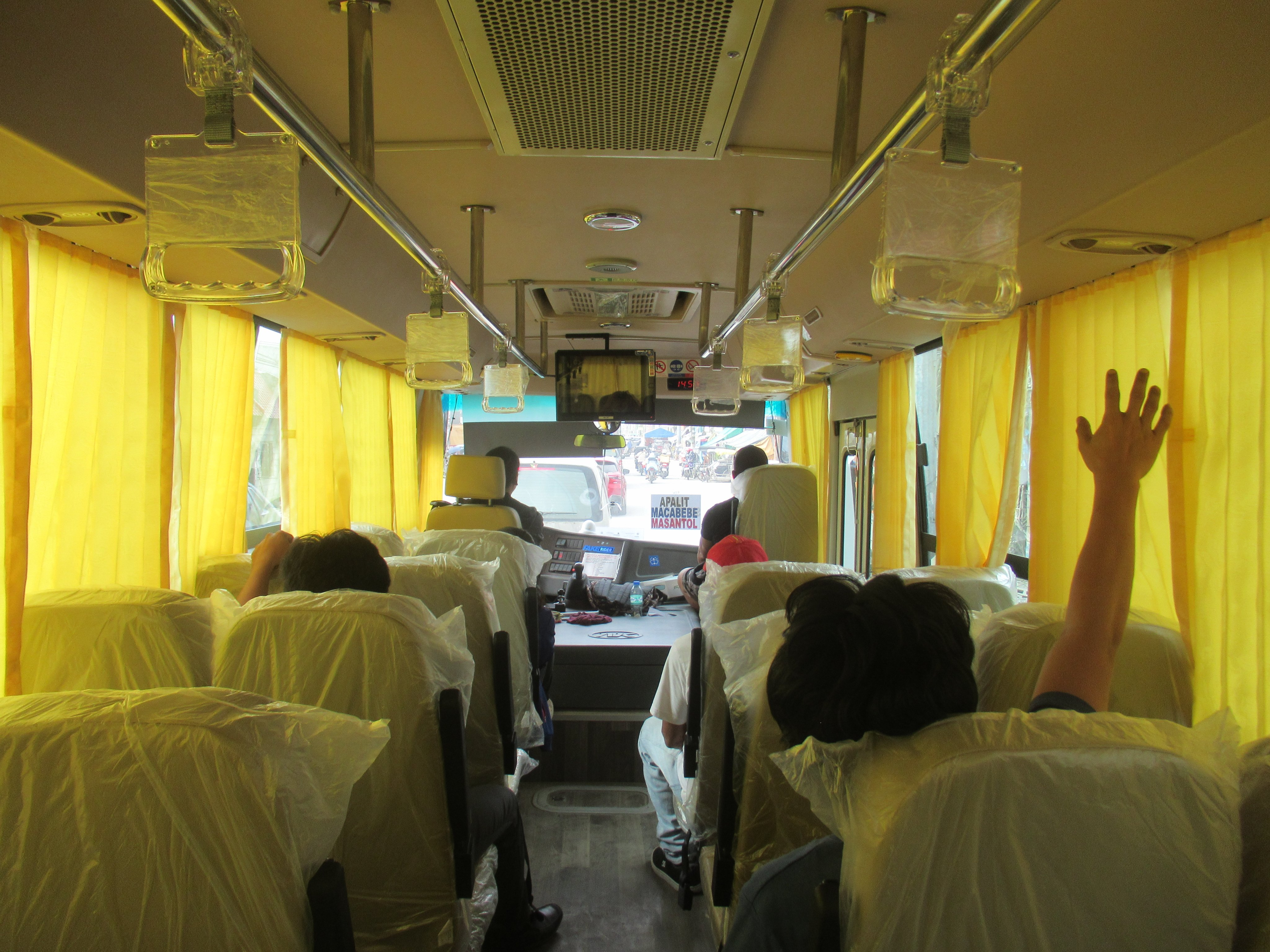
Interior of a new modern jeepney

=== Financing ===
An estimated ₱1.5 billion will be given to transport corporations and cooperatives to purchase new PUVs through the Development Bank of the Philippines' Program assistance to Support Alternative Driving Approaches (PASADA). The program will feature a 5-percent equity for vehicle purchase, 6-percent interest rate and seven-year repayment period.

Under PASADA, a maximum of 95 percent of the cost of the vehicle, and a maximum of 75 percent of the cost of the support facilities comprise the total loan per borrower. The government will also offer a maximum subsidy of ₱80,000 to cover the equity payment. The subsidy was raised to ₱160,000 in 2020.

A memorandum of understanding with the Land Bank of the Philippines was also signed by the DOTr to set up a ₱1 billion financing for PUJs via the Special Environment-Friendly and Efficiently Driven (SPEED) Jeepney Program.

According to a Development Bank of the Philippines representative, loans for modern jeepneys may only be considered upon the creation and approval of local public transport route plans by local government units.

==== Debt repayment ====
Compared to traditional jeepneys, modern jeepneys are 1,766.7 percent more expensive at ₱2.8 million per unit. A subsidy of ₱160,000 will cover no more than 5.7% of the total cost of one modern jeepney. According to one computation, jeepney drivers will need to earn ₱3,500 per day to repay their debt (compared to drivers' current estimated income of ₱2,000 per day).

==== Others expenses ====
A study published in the Philippine Transportation Journal stated that a number of expenses were overlooked—such as the setting up of charging stations, maintenance, and vehicle insurance—when the jeepney modernization was piloted in General Santos City.

=== Phases ===
According to the DOTr, the proposed implementation time frame is as follows:

- Q4 2017 Pilot program in Metro Manila
- 2018–2019 Metro Manila, Metro Cebu, Metro Davao
- 2019–2020 Highly Urbanized Cities, Rest of the Country

=== Complementary programs ===
- Cebu Bus Rapid Transit System
- Davao Public Transport Modernization Project

=== Franchise consolidation ===
The December 31, 2023, deadline for the consolidation of PUV drivers and operators was not extended by President Bongbong Marcos, which led to another transport strike by transport group Pinagkaisang Samahan ng Tsuper and Opereytor Nationwide (PISTON) on December 14-15, with their continued call to scrap the December 31 deadline and the complete removal of the mandatory franchise consolidation and the PUV Modernization Program. However, upon the recommendation of Transport Secretary Jamie Bautista, President Marcos extended the deadline up to April 30, 2024, since a large number of franchise holders hasn't consolidated yet.

Gabriela Women's Party-list Rep. Arlene Brosas and fellow members of the Makabayan bloc in the House of Representatives filed a resolution asking the Land Transportation Franchising Regulatory Board (LTFRB) to scrap the December 31, 2023, deadline for franchise consolidation.

A 2023 Senate resolution stated that "the LTFRB should not coerce PUV operators into complying with their guidelines without addressing the sector’s concerns."

==== Financial losses ====
Some jeepney drivers have reported financial losses caused by franchise consolidation. Citing data from the Development Bank of the Philippines and Land Bank of the Philippines, Manibela said that more than a thousand jeepney drivers and operators were burdened by large debts after joining cooperatives.

Other jeepney groups and cooperatives reported that franchise consolidation resulted in financial losses, large debts, and having their livelihoods taken. One modern jeepney driver said that his income was significantly reduced due to a quota system that replaced the boundary system.

==== Risk of corporate takeover ====
The franchise consolidation guidelines prohibit individual jeepney owners from applying for their own franchise. According to a study by the University of the Philippines Center for Integrative and Development Studies, this presents a risk of corporate takeover of the transport sector, which would further marginalize jeepney drivers. The policy brief contends that public transport is a public good "that should not be handed over to huge corporations and their profit interests". The policy brief recommends alternatives proposed by transport groups that would create employment in the transport industry, including in the repair and manufacture of parts for rehabilitated jeepneys, as well as provide safe, reliable, and affordable transport to commuters.

== Reception ==
=== Support ===
At least twenty government agencies and twenty-four transport groups from across the country supported the launch of the program. Among transport groups that supported the initiative are the Federation of Jeepney Operators and Drivers Association (FEJODAP), 1-United Transport Koalisyon (1-UTAK), Alliance of Transport Operators and Drivers Association of the Philippines (ALTODAP), and Coalition of Operators, Drivers, Employees, Atbp. (CODE-X), and the Philippine Confederation of Drivers and Operators – Alliance of Concerned Transport Organizations (PCDO-ACTO). Pangkalahatang Sanggunian Manila & Suburbs Drivers Association (PASANG-MASDA) also expressed support. Their president Obet Martin stated, "it was high time for the country to replace the current jeepneys to more modern and more efficient units".

A 2019 study also showed that majority of commuters prefer to ride an e-jeepney than a conventional jeepney in areas where it is available, as it provides a safer, environment-friendly, and more comfortable ride.

=== Criticism ===
Even before its launch, the program was received negatively by various transport groups. While Senate Bill 1284 and House Bill 4334, the program's enabling legislation, were still pending in February 2017, some jeepney drivers launched numerous strikes and demonstrations in Metro Manila and in key cities throughout the country.

Cooperative Development Authority noted that jeepney driver-operator groups were not included in technical working groups for the jeepney modernization program. Vice President Leni Robredo said jeepney drivers and operators, as well as the riding public, should be allowed to take part in public consultations regarding the program.

Senator Grace Poe, chair of the Senate public services committee, expressed doubt over the governments readiness to implement the program nationwide. According to Poe, the government will have to shell out ₱415 billion for full implementation of the scheme, far more than the ₱2.26 billion it approved. She suggested that the PUV Modernization Program be implemented in select cities instead.

Senator Poe and Senate Majority Leader Vicente "Tito" Sotto III called for a "middle ground" solution, saying that old but road worthy PUVs should be allowed to operate. However, the DOTr has given no clear commitment to their suggestion. Senator Franklin Drilon criticized the program's mismanagement and "hodge-podge planning".

Senate Minority Leader Koko Pimentel in January 2024 said the high cost of modernization would place drivers in debt and lead to a crisis in transportation. He said the government should suspend the program indefinitely.

In July 2024, Senate President Chiz Escudero said the jeepney modernization program should be suspended because operators could not afford the expensive modern jeepneys. In the same month 22 Philippine Senators signed Senate Resolution No. 1096 calling for the suspension of the program. The resolution sought to prevent the loss of livelihood among jeepney drivers and operators.

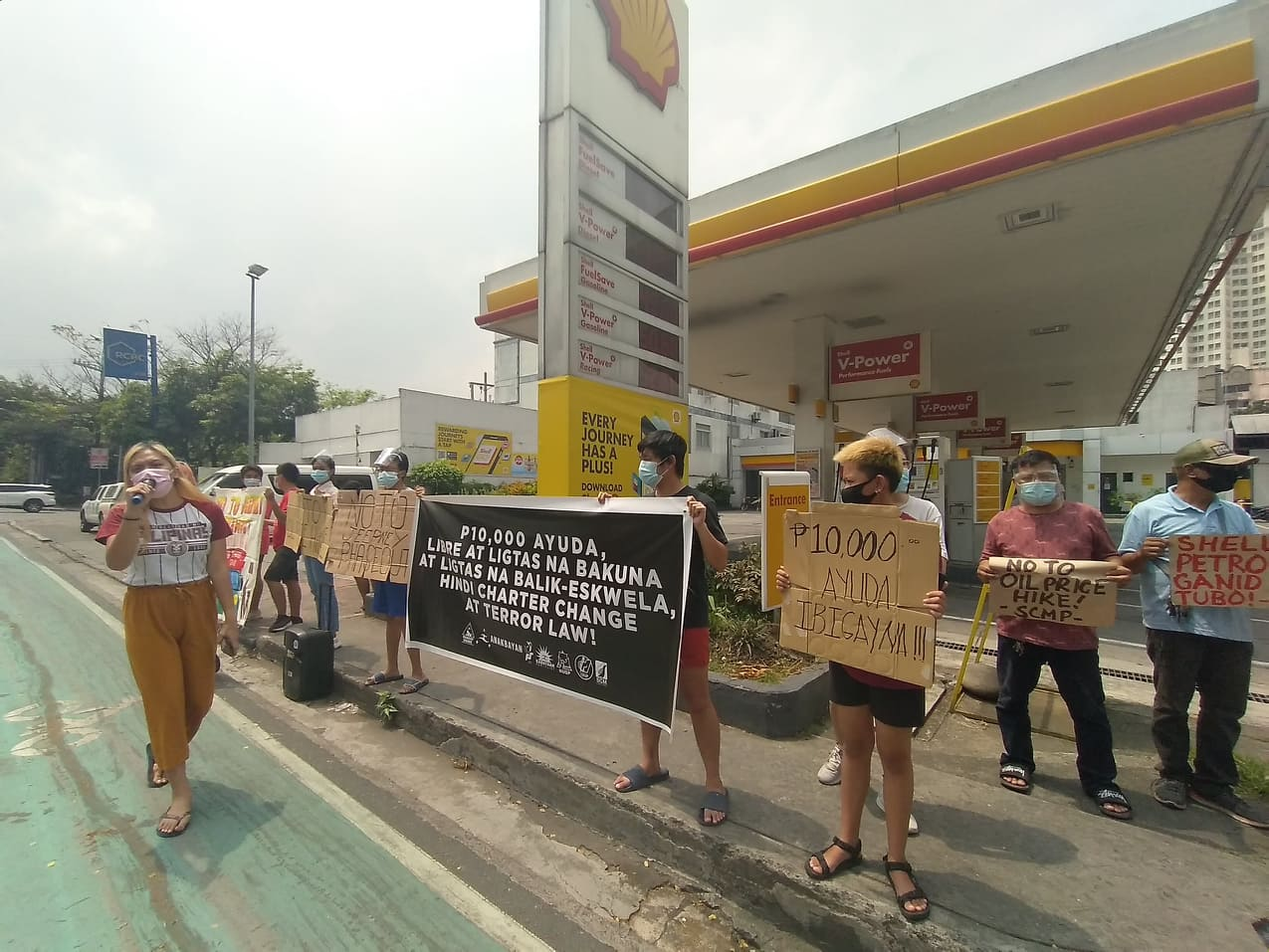
Transport and youth groups, together with SCMP, calling for economic aid and calling out against oil price hike and jeepney phaseout amidst COVID-19 pandemic.

In the House of Representatives, Representative Sarah Elago noted how the program displaces single franchise owners, owing to provisions in the law requiring franchises to own a minimum of 20 units, amounting to ₱7 million of capital. Youth group Student Christian Movement of the Philippines (SCMP) slammed President Duterte on Independence Day 2021 as a "puppet" enforcing neoliberal policies such as jeepney phaseout.

Kabataan party-list Rep. Raoul Manuel in December 2023 said he hoped that the jeepney phaseout would be canceled to ensure that drivers and small operators would be able to keep their livelihoods.

Church groups such as the Catholic Bishops' Conference of the Philippines (CBCP), Caritas Philippines, and Philippine Misereor Partnership, Inc. said the program should consider the effect on families and jobs. The CBCP called on the government to "ensure a just transition that protects the livelihoods of jeepney operators and drivers".

Labor groups Trade Union Congress of the Philippines, Sentro ng mga Nagkakaisa at Progresibong Manggagawa (Center of United and Progressive Workers) and Federation of Free Workers criticized the loss of jobs that the modernization program will cause.

Business leaders from the Philippine Chamber of Commerce and Industry, the Employers Confederation of the Philippines, and the Philippine Exporters Confederation Inc. criticized the negative impact the modernization program will have on the livelihoods of jeepney operators, drivers, and drivers' families.

==== Possible fare increase ====
Transport group PISTON claims that commuters will be hit with an increased fare of at least ₱20. Manibela suggested a minimum fare increase of ₱25 to ₱30 to cover the cost of acquiring a modern jeepney. Research group IBON Foundation estimates that fares could increase to ₱50 within 5 years (from the current minimum fare of ₱13) owing to the corporatized setup of the modernization program.

A 2023 policy paper by the University of the Philippines Center for Integrative and Development Studies argues that the high cost of modern jeepneys will result in the cost being borne by commuters.

At a roundtable discussion at the University of the Philippines in 2024, retired University of the Philippines scientist Teodoro Mendoza said that claims of the DOTr and the LTFRB that there will be no fare increases are false. He estimated fares of ₱27 to ₱40 based on a modern jeepneys price of ₱2.5 million. Jeepney manufacturer Sarao Motors said fares will increase given the high monthly loan amortization that operators will have to pay to banks.

==== Effect on livelihoods ====
According to Kilusang Mayo Uno (KMU) and PISTON, the ₱1.4 million to ₱1.6 million cost of new jeepneys will adversely affect the livelihood of 600,000 public utility jeepney (PUJ) drivers and 300,000 small operators. For drivers, operators, and other transport stakeholders, the modernization may result in possible losses of jobs and businesses.

The Land Transportation Franchising and Regulatory Board said that 38,000 drivers could lose their jobs, based on the number of unconsolidated jeepneys as of January 2024.

In a 2023 petition filed before the Philippine Supreme Court, transport groups argued that the modernization plan violated the right of jeepney drivers to gainful employment and livelihood and would result in worsening social inequality in the country.

The Philippine Commission on Human Rights said in a January 2024 statement that the modernization plan should not be done at the expense of jeepney operators' right to a sustainable livelihood.

===== Job loss among jeepney manufacturers =====
According to Elmer Francisco of Francisco Motors, many workers at jeepney manufacturers such as Francisco Motors, Sarao Motors, Melford, Armak, Wild Country, Hayag, and Morales Motors have already lost their jobs owing to uncertainties brought about by the push for the modernization program.

=== Protests ===
The transport group Stop and Go Coalition held a strike on September 24, 2017. On October 16 and 17, PISTON held a two-day transportation strike. In a press statement, Alliance of Concerned Transport Organizations President Efren de Luna stated that their group did not join the transport strike as they found that PUV modernization wants to ensure the security of passengers and to have an environmentally sustainable mode of transportation.

Manibela held a 3-day strike in November 2023 to protest the PUV Modernization Program. Members of Pasang Masda and FEJODAP joined the strike according to Manibela.

== Corruption allegations ==
In October 2023, Senator Grace Poe called on the Department of Transportation to suspend the implementation of the jeepney modernization program amid corruption allegation in the LTFRB. LTFRB Chair Teofilo Guadiz III was suspended over corruption allegations related to the granting of route franchises.

The House of Representatives was set to begin in January 2024 an inquiry into allegations of corruption relating to the modernization program.

=== Legal issue ===
On May 14, 2024, the Supreme Court of the Philippines, instead of issuing a TRO, required the defendants Department of Transportation and the Land Transportation Franchising and Regulatory Board to Answer within 10 days, the April 29 temporary restraining order-supplemental petition of PISTON. On the Public Utility Vehicle Modernization Program, the Court further required submission of status updates on consolidating PUV franchises on a per-route basis, on the Local Public Transport Route Plan per locality and the Route Rationalization Plan, and the hearings before the House of Representatives, said SC Court Spokesperson Attorney Camille Sue Mae L. Ting.

== See also ==
- Transportation in the Philippines
- Jeepney
- Taxicabs of the Philippines
