= 2025 in the Philippines =

- Decades: 2000s; 2010s; 2020s
- See also: List of years in the Philippines; films; music; television; sports

2025 in the Philippines details notable events that occurred in the Philippines in 2025.

== Incumbents ==
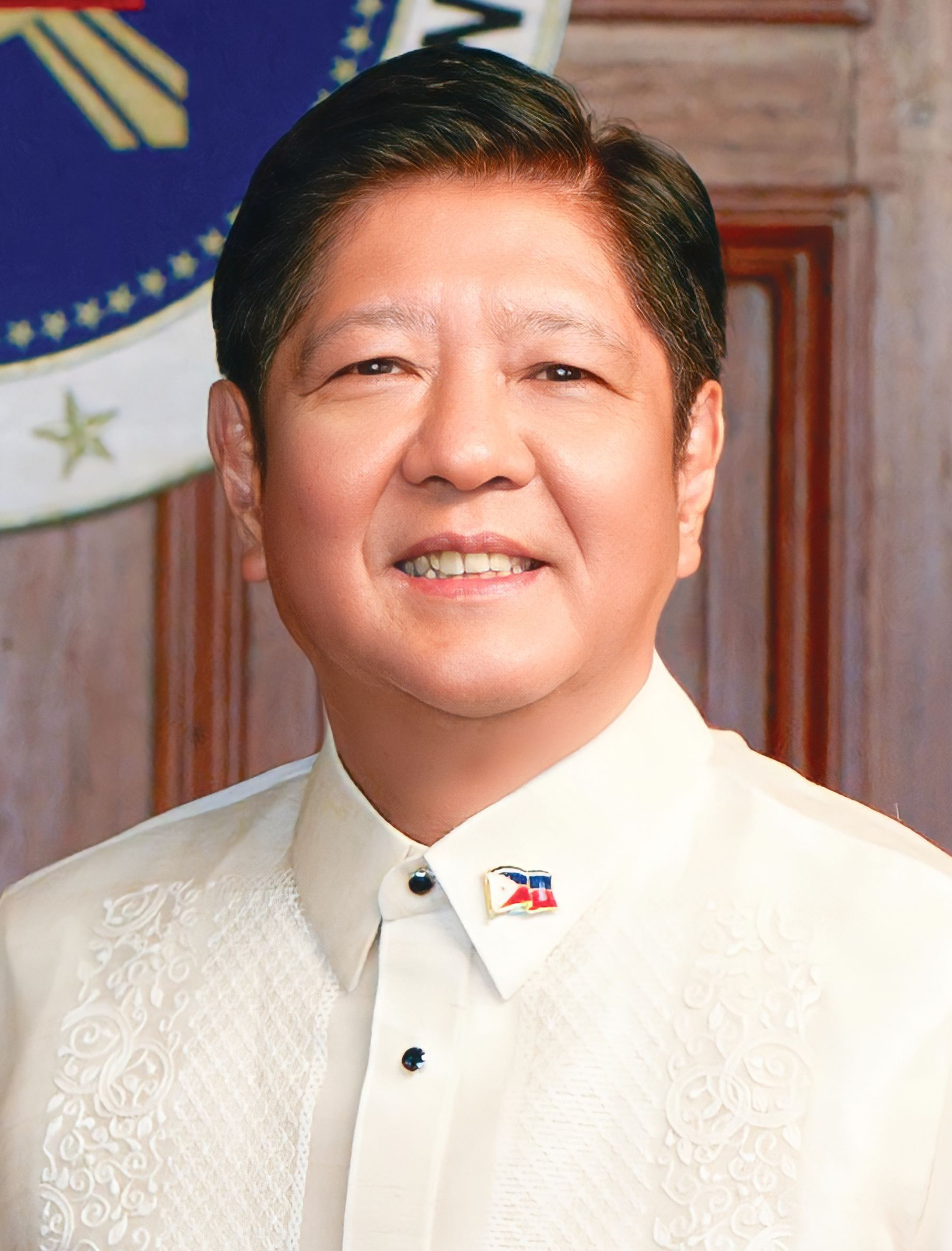
Ferdinand R. Marcos Jr.

Sara Z. Duterte

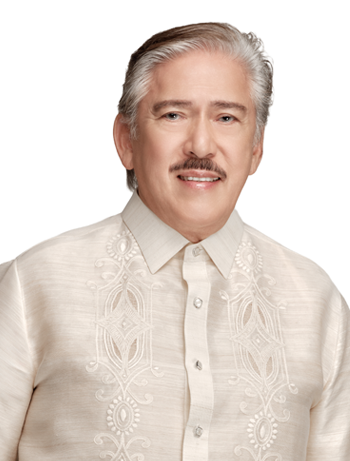
Vicente C.
Sotto III

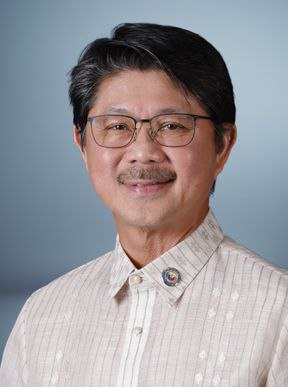
Faustino D.
Dy III

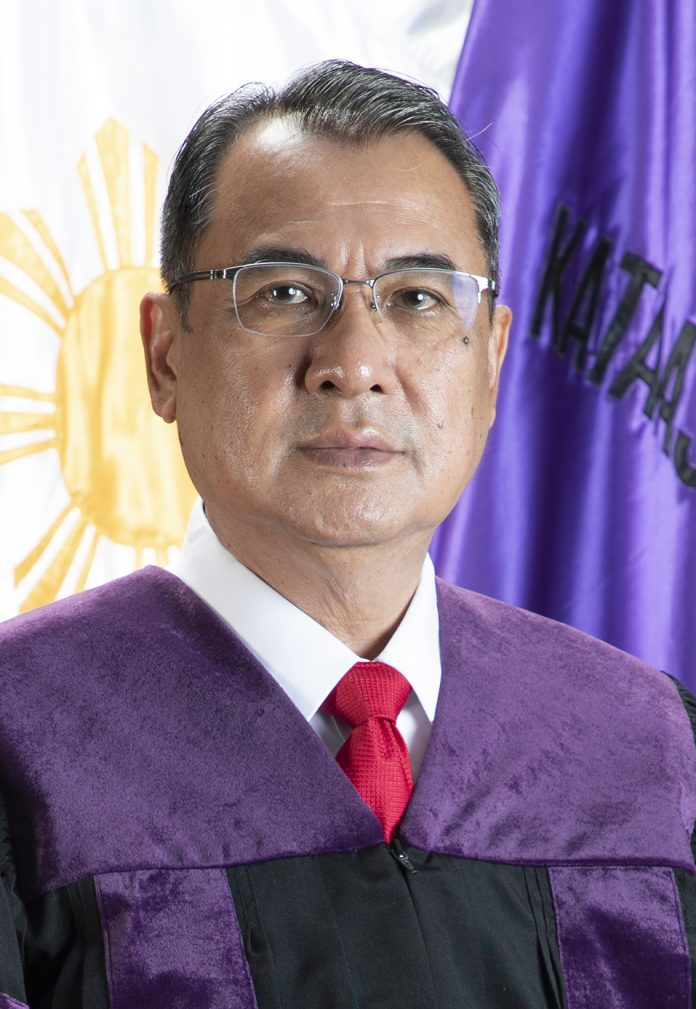
Alexander G. Gesmundo

- President: Bongbong Marcos (PFP)
- Vice President: Sara Duterte (HNP)
- Congress:
  - (19th): (until June 13)
    - Senate President: Francis Escudero (NPC)
    - House Speaker: Martin Romualdez (Lakas-CMD)
  - (20th): (from July 28)
    - Senate President:
      - Francis Escudero (NPC) (until September 8)
      - Tito Sotto (NPC) (from September 8)
    - House Speaker:
      - Martin Romualdez (Lakas-CMD) (until September 17)
      - Bojie Dy (PFP) (from September 17)
- Chief Justice: Alexander Gesmundo

== Ongoing events ==
- Impeachment of Sara Duterte
- Flood control projects controversy

== Events ==
=== January ===
- January 3 – Executive Secretary Lucas Bersamin announces President Marcos' enactment four days earlier of Executive Order No. 81 which reorganizes the National Security Council, with the Vice President and former presidents being stripped of their membership.
- January 6:
  - Philippines–United States relations: The Philippines begins hosting Afghan refugees seeking to resettle in the United States as part of a July 2024 agreement between the Philippines and the U.S. to temporarily host a U.S. immigrant visa processing center.
  - The Bases Conversion and Development Authority reassumes control over Camp John Hay in Baguio as part of a 2024 Supreme Court arbitral ruling ordering the Camp John Hay Development Corporation to vacate the property.
- January 8 – A state of calamity is declared in Ubay, Bohol due to an outbreak of African swine fever.
- January 9 – The Sandiganbayan acquits former vice president Jejomar Binay and his son, former Makati mayor Junjun Binay for graft and falsification cases related to alleged irregularities in the construction of the Makati Science High School building.
- January 12 – A state of calamity is declared in Jipapad, Eastern Samar, due to flooding caused by a shear line.
- January 13:
  - The Iglesia ni Cristo holds the National Rally for Peace, a nationwide demonstration to express disapproval of impeachment efforts against Vice President Duterte. At the Quirino Grandstand alone, 1.5 million people attend the rally.
  - The Supreme Court strikes down the Commission on Elections' policy of disqualifying prospective national candidates for lack of campaign funds as nuisance candidates following an appeal from Juan Juan Ollesca, who was deemed as such in the 2022 presidential election.
- January 14 – The Supreme Court strikes down a 25-year moratorium on large-scale mining in Occidental Mindoro introduced in 2008, saying that the local governments can prohibit specific mining projects but cannot do so for all large-scale mining activities within their jurisdiction.
- January 20:
  - The Sandiganbayan convicts former Quezon City mayor Herbert Bautista and former city administrator Aldrin Cuña of graft over the procurement of an Online Occupational Permitting Tracking System in 2019 and sentences them to up to ten years' imprisonment.
  - The Armed Forces of the Philippines announces the arrest of Chinese national Deng Yuanqing and two Filipino accomplices for conducting surveillance on sensitive installations.
- January 23 – The national government confirms that 17 Filipinos are among the 25 crew members of M/V Galaxy Leader who have been released from captivity by Houthi rebels after being held off Yemen since the seizure of the boat in the Red Sea in November 2023 in connection to the Israeli attacks in Gaza.
- January 25 – The Catholic Bishops' Conference of the Philippines designates as national shrines the EDSA Shrine in Quezon City, the Sampaloc Church in Manila, and the Diocesan Shrine of Our Lady of Aranzazu in San Mateo, Rizal.
- January 27:
  - President Marcos grants executive clemency to former Iloilo City mayor Jed Patrick Mabilog, who had been charged with graft before the Ombudsman.
  - The Department of Justice releases a January 10 resolution withdrawing 98 charges of reckless imprudence resulting in homicide against former health secretary Janette Garin filed over the Dengvaxia controversy.
- January 28 – The Sandiganbayan convicts Mary Ann Maslog of graft in relation to a 1998 textbook scam involving officials of the Department of Education, Culture, and Sports and sentences her to up to ten years' imprisonment. The conviction is issued after its original 2019 date had been postponed due to Maslog faking her death and going into hiding under a false name until her discovery and arrest in 2024.

=== February ===
- February 3 – Agriculture Secretary Francisco Tiu Laurel Jr. declares a food security emergency on rice due to rising prices.
- February 4 – Anwar Saluwang, the mayor of Nabalawag in the Special Geographic Area of Cotabato, is arrested in Davao City for violating a nationwide gun ban imposed as part of the 2025 Philippine general election.
- February 5 – Sara Duterte becomes the first Vice President of the Philippines to be impeached after 215 members of the House of Representatives vote to support an impeachment complaint against her that include charges of corruption, plotting to assassinate President Marcos and other officials, involvement in extrajudicial killings and incitement to insurrection and public disorder.
- February 6 – A Beechcraft King Air 300 aircraft contracted by the US Department of Defense for reconnaissance missions crashes in Ampatuan, Maguindanao del Sur, killing all four people on board.
- February 7 – A court in Winnipeg, Canada dismisses a 2018 defamation case filed by the Iglesia ni Cristo against the Canadian Broadcasting Corporation over a series of television reports on alleged abuses within the group, citing its non-compliance of court rules.
- February 11–21 – A state of calamity is declared in Puerto Princesa and the municipalities of Aborlan, Brooke's Point and Narra in Palawan due to flooding caused by a shear line.
- February 12:
  - The Sandiganbayan acquits Janet Lim-Napoles and former Agusan del Sur representative Rodolfo Plaza of graft in relation to a case of the PDAF scam involving ₱27.5 million in public funds.
  - Myrna Sularte, the highest-known ranking official of the New People's Army in Mindanao and a member of the politburo of the Communist Party of the Philippines, is killed in an encounter with soldiers in Butuan.
- February 18:
  - President Marcos signs into law Republic Act No. 12122, fixing the term of the Commandant of the Philippine Coast Guard to a maximum of three years.
  - The Sandiganbayan dismisses an ill-gotten wealth case filed in 1987 by the Presidential Commission on Good Governance (PCGG) against former president Ferdinand Marcos and first lady Imelda Marcos concerning motor vehicles and appliances acquired by co-accused Fernando Timbol, citing an unreasonable period of inaction by the plaintiff.
- February 21 – The Financial Action Task Force removes the Philippines from its gray list of countries with serious money laundering issues.
- February 24:
  - The Sandiganbayan dismisses a petition by the United Coconut Planters Life Assurance Corporation (COCOLIFE) against the transfer of the company's 255 million shares in the United Coconut Planters Bank to the government, saying that the said assets were acquired as part of government-imposed coconut levies.
  - The municipality of Baggao, Cagayan, is declared "insurgency-free" by the government.
- February 25 – The National Bureau of Investigation (NBI) announces the arrest of two Chinese nationals and three Filipino accomplices for conducting surveillance on sensitive installations in Metro Manila, including at Malacañang Palace.
- February 27 – A segment of the Cabagan–Santa Maria Bridge in Isabela collapses as four vehicles pass over, injuring six people.

=== March ===
- March 4 – An FA-50PH fighter jet of the Philippine Air Force crashes into Mount Kalatungan in Bukidnon during an operation against the New People's Army, killing its two crew.
- March 5 – President Marcos signs into law Republic Act No. 12124 or the Expanded Tertiary Education Equivalency and Accreditation Program (ETEEAP) Act, expanding access to tertiary education particularly among working professionals.
- March 7 – The Department of Environment and Natural Resources cancels its joint venture agreement with Blue Star Construction Development Corporation, which manages the Masungi Georeserve in Tanay, Rizal, citing multiple violations by the latter.
- March 11 – Former president Rodrigo Duterte is arrested at Ninoy Aquino International Airport in Pasay for crimes against humanity due to an arrest warrant by the International Criminal Court (ICC). He is transported by plane that night to the ICC headquarters in the Netherlands.
- March 19 – Eight people, including five Chinese and a Cambodian, are arrested on suspicion of spying and kidnapping in Grande Island in Subic Bay.
- March 20:
  - The Supreme Court orders the eviction of Romeo Jalosjos and Dakak Beach Resort Corporation from the Dakak Beach Resort in Dapitan, Zamboanga del Norte, after ruling that they had profited from the property despite not paying rent to the landowner in the preceding 20 years.
  - Philippines–Timor-Leste relations: The Court of Appeal of Timor-Leste overturns the planned extradition of expelled Negros Oriental representative Arnie Teves to face charges in the Pamplona massacre.
- March 24 – Finance Secretary Ralph Recto, Bureau of Customs commissioner Bienvenido Rubio, and Bureau of Internal Revenue deputy commissioner Marissa Cabreros sign the implementing rules and regulations for Republic Act No. 12079, allowing foreign tourists in the Philippines to obtain refunds on value-added tax for locally purchased goods worth at least ₱3,000 (around US$50), provided the items are taken out of the country within 60 days of purchase.
- March 24–26 – Manibela holds a nationwide transportation strike in protest over allegations of misrepresentation by the Land Transportation Franchising and Regulatory Board (LTFRB) of consolidation rates in the Public Utility Vehicle Modernization Program.
- March 25 – The Ombudsman imposes a six-month suspension on Marikina Mayor Marcelino Teodoro, Vice Mayor Marion Andres, and 13 members of the Marikina City Council as part of an investigation into the alleged misuse of ₱130 million (US$2.25 million) in PhilHealth funds.
- March 31 – Mitzel Silva-Campo becomes the first woman to become a rear admiral of the Philippine Coast Guard.

=== April ===
- April 3 – China–Philippine espionage cases: Three Filipino nationals are arrested in China, on suspicion of spying for Philippine intelligence.
- April 4 – The National Telecommunications Commission revokes Now Telecom's operating license, citing failure to comply with critical regulatory and operational requirements and the firm owing ₱3.57 billion in unpaid regulatory fees.
- April 10:
  - President Marcos signs into law Republic Act No. 12145, reorganizing and renaming the National Economic and Development Authority (NEDA) into the Department of Economy, Planning and Development (DepDev).
  - The Ombudsman orders the dismissal of Albay Governor Edcel Greco Lagman for receiving money from jueteng operations when he was Vice Governor.
- April 11 – President Marcos signs into law Republic Act No. 12160 or the Philippine Islamic Burial Act, regulating Islamic funerals in the Philippines.
- April 15:
  - Philippines and weapons of mass destruction: President Marcos signs into law Republic Act No. 12174 or the Chemical Weapons Prohibition Act, prohibiting the development, production, stockpiling, and use of chemical weapons in the Philippines.
  - Carrier vessel MV Hong Hai 16, which has carrying sand and its 25 crewmen, capsizes off Rizal, Occidental Mindoro. Six of 13 Filipinos and eight of 12 Chinese are later rescued. Until April 20, nine bodies are recovered while two are reported missing.
- April 24:
  - President Marcos issues Executive Order No. 86, authorizing the issuance of specific visas for digital nomads to the Philippines.
  - President Marcos signs into law Republic Act No. 12180 or the Phivolcs Modernization Act, allotting ₱7 billion to upgrade the facilities and services of the Philippine Institute of Volcanology and Seismology (PHIVOLCS).
- April 27 – The China Coast Guard is reported to have seized Sand Cay, which is also claimed by the Philippines, in the South China Sea.
- April 28:
  - PHIVOLCS raises Alert Level 1 over Mount Bulusan in Sorsogon following a phreatic eruption.
  - The Ombudsman imposes a six-month suspension on Cebu Governor Gwendolyn Garcia for issuing a construction permit to a private firm without securing clearance from the Department of Environment and Natural Resources.
  - The first successful vocal implant surgery in the Philippines is performed on a 60-year old patient suffering from unilateral vocal fold paralysis at the University of Santo Tomas Hospital in Manila.
- April 29 – The NBI arrests a Chinese national on suspicion of conducting surveillance outside the headquarters of the Commission on Elections (COMELEC) in Manila.
- April 30:
  - New Zealand–Philippines relations: New Zealand Defense Minister Judith Collins and Philippine Defense Secretary Gilbert Teodoro sign a visiting forces agreement, witnessed by President Marcos at Malacañang Palace.
  - The Sandiganbayan convicts former Bacolod mayor Luzviminda Valdez and an aide of falsifying cash slips to inflate reimbursements and sentences them to 42 years' imprisonment.

=== May ===
- May 1 – At least 10 people are killed while 31 others are injured in a multiple-vehicle collision at the Tarlac City toll plaza of the Subic–Clark–Tarlac Expressway.
- May 2 – Philippine Infradev Holdings announces the cancellation of the Makati Intra-city Subway project, citing complications caused by the transfer of territory to be traversed by the line and related infrastructure from Makati to Taguig following the Supreme Court's ruling on the Makati–Taguig boundary dispute.
- May 4 – Ninoy Aquino International Airport car crash: Two people are killed in a car-ramming outside Terminal 1 of Ninoy Aquino International Airport, prompting criticism over parking and security arrangements at the airport.
- May 5 – The decommissioned Philippine Navy vessel BRP Miguel Malvar sinks off the coast of Zambales while being towed to be sunk in target practice as part of joint exercises with the US military.
- May 12 – The nationwide general election is held. Administration candidates win majority of the Senate as re-electionist Bong Go of Partido Demokratiko Pilipino receives what will be the country's highest number of votes for any senatorial candidate. Lakas-CMD remains as a majority political party in the Congress and the local government. Meanwhile, 53 of 54 winning party-list groups are later proclaimed by the Commission on Elections.
- May 14 – A state of calamity is declared in Borongan, Eastern Samar due to an outbreak of African swine fever.
- May 19–23 – A state of calamity is declared in Kumalarang, Zamboanga del Sur and in parts of Maguindanao del Sur due to flooding caused by an intertropical convergence zone in Mindanao.
- May 20–29 – A state of emergency is declared in Samar and Tacloban due to repairs on the San Juanico Bridge connecting Samar Island and Leyte.
- May 20 – The mayor of South Upi, Maguindanao del Sur, Reynalbert Insular, is arrested along with his wife on suspicion of masterminding the killing of his vice mayor, Roldan Benito, in 2024.
- May 22 – The Sandiganbayan acquits former agriculture secretaries Bernie Fondevilla and Proceso Alcala of graft over the anomalous procurement of 1,500 well pumps and engines valued at a total of ₱144.405 million in 2010.
- May 28:
  - The Constitutional Government of Timor-Leste announces that expelled former Negros Oriental representative Arnie Teves, the main suspect in the 2023 assassination of Negros Oriental governor Roel Degamo, had been deported back to the Philippines, following his arrest by the Immigration Service of Timor-Leste. He is later placed under the custody of Philippine authorities and repatriated on May 29.
  - A court-martial acquits former Presidential Security Group commander Brigadier General Jesus Durante III of involvement in the 2022 murder of businesswoman Yvonette Chua Plaza in Davao City.
- May 30 – The Sandiganbayan convicts Muntinlupa Mayor Ruffy Biazon and Janet Lim-Napoles of graft in a case of the PDAF scam involving ₱3 million in public funds and sentences them to up to eight years' imprisonment.
- May 31 – COMELEC upholds the disqualification and removal of Manuel Mamba as governor of Cagayan for violating regulations against public spending during campaigning for the 2022 Philippine general election.

=== June ===
- June 2 – A state of emergency is declared in Pakil, Laguna due to an increase in dengue cases.
- June 5:
  - A state of calamity is declared in Siquijor due to rotating blackouts caused by electricity shortages.
  - Edward Flores, the suspected leader of the New People's Army's Far South Mindanao Region Committee operating in Soccsksargen, is arrested by government forces in Cagayan de Oro.
  - President Marcos issues Proclamation No. 920 declaring a state of calamity in Eastern Visayas due to repairs on the San Juanico Bridge connecting Samar and Leyte.
- June 9 – The province of Basilan is declared free from the Abu Sayyaf Group by the government.
- June 10:
  - The European Union removes the Philippines from its list of high risk jurisdictions for money laundering and terrorism financing.
  - The Sandiganbayan convicts former Misamis Occidental representative Loreto Leo Ocampos of graft and fraud in a case of the PDAF scam involving ₱2.1 million in public funds and sentences him to up to 10 years' imprisonment.
- June 13 – A court in Pasig acquits Rappler CEO Maria Ressa and five other Rappler executives of violating restrictions on foreigners owning companies under the Anti-Dummy Law.
- June 16 – The academic year (2025–2026) is started by the Department of Education, as part of their efforts to revert to the old school calendar.
- June 17 – The Sandiganbayan dismisses an ill-gotten wealth case filed in 2014 by the Ombudsman against former Justice Secretary Hernando Perez concerning the extortion of $2 million from former Manila representative Mark Jimenez during a plunder investigation in 2001, citing insufficient evidence.
- June 20 – The Supreme Court strikes down the practice of proclaiming second-place finishers in elections as winners in the event of their rival's disqualification and orders the application of succession rules in dismissing an electoral protest filed by Sultan Kudarat Governor Pax Ali Mangudadatu against COMELEC and his rival, Sharifa Akeel, regarding the outcome of the 2022 gubernatorial election.
- June 23 – A court in Manila acquits 12 Philippine National Police officers of murder over the deaths of 13 people in a 2013 shootout against a suspected jueteng lord in Atimonan, Quezon, that was marred by allegations that it was a rubout.
- June 26 – The Sandiganbayan dismisses the last remaining civil case under the Coco Levy Fund scam pertaining to the ownership of PepsiCo's subsidiaries in the Philippines, citing the PCGG's argument that pursuing the case is now "unwarranted".
- June 27:
  - A court in Muntinlupa acquits former senator Leila de Lima of drug trafficking charges a month after the Court of Appeals voided an earlier acquittal issued in 2023 and ordered a new decision.
  - A court in Manila rules that former Bamban, Tarlac mayor Alice Guo is a Chinese citizen and therefore ineligible to hold public office in the Philippines, leading to the voiding of her term as mayor.
  - The Sandiganbayan convicts former Philippine Tourism Authority general manager Robert Dean Barbers of graft over the unauthorized construction of a ₱3.7-million sports complex in Intramuros, Manila, in 2005 and sentences him to up to eight years' imprisonment.
  - Hotel101 Global becomes the first Filipino-owned firm to be listed on the Nasdaq Stock Exchange in the United States.
- June 30:
  - The Sandiganbayan convicts former Narvacan, Ilocos Sur mayor Zuriel Zaragosa of graft over the embezzlement of ₱81 million in tobacco excise tax intended for local farmers in 2016 and sentences him to 10 years' imprisonment.
  - The Ombudsman imposes an 18-month suspension on Camarines Norte governor Ricarte Padilla for appointing personnel to government positions without legal basis.

=== July ===
- July 1 – China imposes sanctions on former senator Francis Tolentino, citing his "egregious conduct on China-related issues". The Philippine Department of Foreign Affairs later summons Chinese ambassador Huang Xilian over the sanctions.
- July 8:
  - (PHT): The bulk carrier MV Eternity C is attacked by Houthis in the Red Sea off Yemen. Among the 25 people on board are 21 Filipino crew members, eight of them are immediately rescued; nine others are captured and released by the rebels in early December through the intervention of the government of Oman; three are killed and one remains missing.
  - The Supreme Court rules in favor of recognizing Alfonso Cusi and Melvin Matibag as legitimate leaders of the Partido Demokratiko Pilipino following an intra-party dispute with a faction led by Koko Pimentel and Manny Pacquiao.
- July 9 – President Marcos signs Republic Act 12228, declaring November 7 annually as Sheikh Karim'ul Makdum Day, a special national working holiday, to commemorate the introduction of Islam and the establishment of the first mosque in the country.
- July 11 – President Marcos vetoes a bill that would have conferred national university status to the Polytechnic University of the Philippines, citing failure to undergo a qualifying assessment.
- July 15 – The Supreme Court rules that the concealment of one's homosexuality from their spouse constitutes a valid basis for the annulment of a marriage on the grounds of fraud.
- July 16:
  - President Marcos issues Proclamation No. 973 declaring the 2024 Philippine census with a population of 112,729,484 as the official count conducted by the Philippine Statistics Authority.
  - The Supreme Court releases an April ruling allowing COMELEC to hold special elections in vacated congressional districts without a resolution from the House of Representatives in a case involving the 3rd district of Palawan.
- July 18–25 – A state of calamity is declared in Bataan, Caloocan, Cavite, Dagupan, La Union, Laguna, Las Piñas, Malabon, Marikina, Muntinlupa, Navotas, Negros Occidental, Occidental Mindoro, Oriental Mindoro, Pampanga, Parañaque, Quezon City, Rizal, Taguig and Valenzuela as well as in parts of Antique, Batangas, Benguet, Bulacan, Davao Occidental, Iloilo, Palawan, Pangasinan, Romblon, Tarlac, and Zambales due to flooding and landslides caused by the southwest monsoon, Tropical Storm Crising (Wipha), Tropical Storm Dante (Francisco) and Typhoon Emong (Co-may). At least 40 people are killed by the storms, while 33 others are injured and eight are reported missing.
- July 19 – The Moro Islamic Liberation Front suspends the decommissioning of its 14,000 remaining soldiers and 2,450 weapons and demands that the national government comply with the Annex of Normalization under the Comprehensive Agreement on the Bangsamoro signed in 2014.
- July 23 (PHT) – Philippines–United States relations: President Marcos and U.S. president Donald Trump reach a trade agreement under which the Philippines adopts an open market policy with the United States and accepts a 19% tariff rate on its exports.
- July 25 – The Supreme Court announces the barring of the impeachment proceedings against Vice President Duterte based on due process grounds, and allowing its refiling in February 2026. The trial is supposed to commence in the Senate on July 30.
- July 28 – President Marcos delivers his 4th State of the Nation Address (SONA).
- July 29 – The Sandiganbayan convicts former Palawan governor Mario Joel Reyes of graft over the misuse of ₱1.53 billion in royalties from the Malampaya gas field from 2008 to 2009 and sentences him to up to 10 years' imprisonment.
- July 31:
  - The Supreme Court overturns a 2015 ruling by the Commission on Audit (COA) that found the Department of Energy, the Philippine National Oil Company, and the domestic subsidiaries of Shell plc and Chevron Corporation liable as contractors of the Malampaya Natural Gas Project for failing to pay ₱53.14 billion in income taxes from 2002 to 2009, citing grave abuse of discretion by COA.
  - President Marcos issues Executive Order No. 91, including Sulu in the Zamboanga Peninsula as a result of a 2024 ruling by the Supreme Court on the exclusion of the province from the Bangsamoro.

=== August ===
- August 3 – India–Philippines relations: The Indian and Philippine navies begin their first joint exercise in the West Philippine Sea.
- August 4:
  - President Marcos signs into law Republic Act No. 12230, designating Paoay Lake in Ilocos Norte as a Protected Area to be known as the Paoay Lake Protected Landscape.
  - President Marcos signs into law Republic Act No. 12231 or the Government Optimization Act, allowing the Office of the President to dissolve or merge government agencies and positions to eliminate redundancies as part of civil service reform.
  - The Sandiganbayan acquits former Surigao del Sur vice governor Librado Navarro of graft in a case involving the misuse of P131,887 in public funds, citing an inordinate delay in investigation by the Ombudsman.
  - The Sandiganbayan acquits former Capiz governor Esteban Evan Contreras on charges of splitting contracts in the procurement of medical supplies and equipment, citing insufficient evidence.
- August 5 – Abundio Punsalan Jr., the mayor of San Simon, Pampanga, is arrested on charges of accepting ₱80-million in bribes from a private firm seeking a favorable resolution from the local government.
- August 6:
  - The Senate votes 19–4 with one abstention, to archive the articles of impeachment against Vice President Sara Duterte, citing the Supreme Court's July 25 decision to block the impeachment process.
  - A dump truck carrying 25 people from Sultan Kudarat, Maguindanao del Norte, plunges down a ravine in Lebak, Sultan Kudarat, while on its way to Cotabato City, killing 12.
- August 11 – A China Coast Guard vessel is damaged after colliding with a People's Liberation Army Navy ship while trying to expel the Philippine Coast Guard vessel BRP Suluan from Scarborough Shoal.
- August 13 – President Marcos signs into law Republic Act No. 12232, setting a four-year term for barangay and Sangguniang Kabataan officials and the date of the regular election at the first Monday of November. In effect, the elections supposed to be held on December 1 are postponed to November 2, 2026.
- August 14:
  - President Marcos signs into law Republic Act No. 12233 or the Judiciary Fiscal Autonomy Act, establishing the Judiciary Trust Fund and ensuring the release of a sustainable budget as part of efforts to ensure the fiscal autonomy of the Philippine judiciary.
  - The Sandiganbayan convicts former LTFRB executive director Samuel Jardin of graft for extorting ₱4.6 million in exchange for issuing registration permits for 32 vans in 2019 and sentences him to up to 10 years' imprisonment.
- August 16 – The Ombudsman imposes a one-year suspension on Nueva Ecija governor Aurelio Umali for issuing quarry permits without clearance from the Department of Environment and Natural Resources.
- August 22:
  - The Sandiganbayan acquits former Makati mayors Jejomar Binay and Junjun Binay of graft, falsification of public documents, and malversation over the construction of the Makati City Parking Building, citing lack of evidence.
  - The Sandiganbayan convicts former Janet Lim-Napoles of graft in a case of the PDAF scam involving the misuse of ₱7.55 million in public funds allocated to then-Davao del Sur representative Marc Douglas Cagas IV and sentences her to up to 18 years' imprisonment.
- August 24 – The Open Access in Data Transmission Act or the Konektadong Pinoy bill, which is aimed at increasing internet access through the relaxation of regulations and allowing more entrants into the data transmission industry, lapses into law without President Marcos' signature.
- August 28 – The Philippine Postal Corporation indefinitely suspends deliveries to the United States in response to tariffs imposed by the Trump administration.
- August 29:
  - China–Philippines relations: China issues a diplomatic protest against the Philippines over the visit of Taiwanese foreign minister Lin Chia-lung to Manila and the Clark Freeport and Special Economic Zone earlier in the week.
  - The COMELEC announces that its en banc has voted, 5–1–1, to affirm the cancellation in June of Duterte Youth's party-list accreditation for failure to submit requirements. The group, despite winning in the May elections, has its proclamation suspended due to the case. The decision is later appealed before the Supreme Court.
- August 31 – Catholic priest Flaviano Antonio Villanueva is declared a recipient of the 2025 Ramon Magsaysay Award for his efforts to support victims of the Philippine drug war.

=== September ===
- September 2 – The Sandiganbayan convicts former Laur, Nueva Ecija mayor Blas Canlas of malversation of public funds involving ₱3.5 million in unliquidated cash in 2006 and sentences him to 10 years' imprisonment.
- September 3 – President Marcos signs into law Republic Act No. 12252, amending the Investors Lease Act and allowing foreign investors to lease property in the country for up to 99 years.
- September 4 – President Marcos signs into law Republic Act No. 12253 or the Enhanced Fiscal Regime for Large-Scale Metallic Mining Act, requiring mining companies operating within government-designated mining sites to pay a royalty of five percent of their gross output.
- September 5 – President Marcos signs into law Republic Act No. 12254 or the E-Governance Act, establishing the ICT Academy and institutionalizing the transition of the government to e-governance.
- September 6 – President Marcos signs into law Republic Acts No. 12237, establishing the Mount Sawtooth Protected Landscape in Mayantoc and San Jose, Tarlac, and 12238, establishing the Panaon Island Protected Seascape in Southern Leyte.
- September 11 – President Marcos signs Executive Order No. 94, establishing the Independent Commission for Infrastructure to investigate the state of flood control and other infrastructure projects following the Flood control projects controversy in the Philippines.
- September 12 – President Marcos signs into law Republic Acts No. 12287 or the Declaration of State of Imminent Disaster Act, allowing for the government to issue a state of imminent disaster for areas to be affected by disasters, and 12290 or the VIP Act, establishing the Virology and Vaccine Institute of the Philippines.
- September 15 – Republic Act No. 12296 or the Sulu State University Charter, which converts the Sulu State College in Patikul and Jolo, Sulu into a state university, lapses into law without President Marcos' signature.
- September 16 – An officer of the Bureau of Fisheries and Aquatic Resources is injured after the China Coast Guard fires water cannons at the BFAR vessel BRP Datu Gumbay Piang while it was carrying out a relief and resupply mission for fishermen near Scarborough Shoal.
- September 17–18 – Manibela and PISTON hold a nationwide transportation strike in protest against corruption.
- September 17 – COMELEC recognizes Gabriela Women's Party as having won one seat in the 2025 Philippine House of Representatives elections following a petition for recomputation of partylist seats filed by Philreca Party-List. The ruling allows Gabriela nominee Sarah Elago to take office as its elected congressional representative.
- September 18 – President Marcos signs into law Republic Act No. 12304, requiring the National Commission on Muslim Filipinos, the Department of Information and Communications Technology and the Supreme Court to establish a digital platform for filing legal documents for Filipino Muslims in sharia courts.
- September 21 – The Trillion Peso March is held across the Philippines, mainly in Metro Manila. While most gatherings are held peacefully, two people are killed, while around 205 others are injured and at least 216 are arrested after riots break out along Recto Avenue in Manila.
- September 24 – The Philippines formally accedes to the High Seas Treaty.
- September 25:
  - President Marcos vetoes a bill that would have expanded the area of the Las Piñas–Parañaque Critical Habitat and Ecotourism Area by 1,128 ha (2,790 acres), citing concerns over its effects on existing reclamation projects in the area and the risk of increased bird strikes in the vicinity of Ninoy Aquino International Airport.
  - President Marcos signs into law Republic Act No. 12308 or the Animal Industry Development and Competitiveness Act (AIDCA), establishing the Animal Competitiveness Enhancement Fund (AnCEF) to promote domestic animal-based agriculture.
- September 26–October 1 – A state of calamity is declared in Cagayan, Ilocos Norte and Dagupan due to damage caused by Typhoon Ragasa (Super Typhoon Nando). At least 13 people are killed by the storm, while 17 others are injured and two reported missing.
- September 26 – President Marcos signs into law Republic Act No. 12305 or the Philippine National Nuclear Energy Safety Act, establishing the Philippine Atomic Energy Regulatory Authority.
- September 27–29 – A state of calamity is declared in the provinces of Masbate, Oriental Mindoro and Romblon and in parts of Aklan and Samar due to damage caused by Typhoon Bualoi (Opong). At least 37 people are killed by the storm, while 13 others are reported missing.
- September 28 – Republic Act No. 12309 or the Free Funeral Services Act, which requires the government to provide free funeral services to poor Filipinos unable to carry out proper burials for relatives, lapses into law without President Marcos' signature.
- September 29 – Zaldy Co resigns as a member of the House of Representatives from Ako Bicol partylist amid criticism over his alleged involvement in the Flood control projects controversy in the Philippines. He is replaced by Jan Franz Norbert Joselito Almario Chan, who is proclaimed by COMELEC on November 12.
- September 30:
  - 3G is phased out while 2G is ongoing shutdown.
  - A magnitude 6.9 earthquake, whose epicenter is located off Bogo, Cebu, hits Visayas and nearby regions; causing extensive damage and killing at least 79 people. Cebu is placed under a state of calamity the following day.
  - The Supreme Court declares two Bangsamoro Autonomy Acts, which created the region's parliamentary districts and later redistributed seven seats for Sulu, unconstitutional; and orders the Commission on Elections to hold the first elections for the regional parliament not later than March 31, 2026. This effectively postpones the elections set for October 13, by virtue of Republic Act No. 12123 signed by President Marcos on February 19.

=== October ===
- October 2 – The Commission on Elections proclaims Abono, Ang Probinsyano and Murang Kuryente party-lists, which ranked 56th–58th in the May elections, winners following its previous day's final decision to disqualify Duterte Youth over various issues surrounding its registration.
- October 3 – President Marcos signs into law Republic Act No. 12310 or the Expanded Philippine Science High School System Act, allowing for the creation of more than one campus of the Philippine Science High School in the same region.
- October 10 – A doublet earthquake with magnitudes of 7.4 and 6.8 respectively, hits off the coast of Manay, Davao Oriental, killing at least 10 people and generating a 30 cm (12 in)-tsunami in Surigao del Sur. A state of calamity is declared in Davao Oriental the next day.
- October 13–15 – Manibela holds a nationwide transportation strike in protest against government crackdowns on traditional jeepneys.
- October 19 – A state of calamity is declared in Roxas City, Capiz due to damage caused by Tropical Storm Fengshen (Ramil). At least seven people are killed by the storm, while one is injured and two reported missing.
- October 23 – President Marcos signs the Anti-POGO Act (Republic Act No. 12312), banning all offshore gaming operations nationwide.
- October 24 – The Sandiganbayan acquits Chief Presidential Legal Counsel Juan Ponce Enrile, his former chief of staff Gigi Reyes and Janet Lim-Napoles of 15 counts of graft over the PDAF scam when Enrile was a senator, but finds Napoles civilly liable and orders her to return millions of pesos to the Bureau of Treasury.
- October 26 – A state of calamity is declared in Manjuyod and Bais, Negros Oriental due to damage caused by the leakage of around 255,000 m^{3} (9,000,000 cu ft) of molasses wastewater into the Tañon Strait from an ethanol distillery owned by Universal Robina.

=== November ===
- November 2 – Canada–Philippines relations: Canadian defence minister David McGuinty and Philippine defense secretary Gilbert Teodoro sign a visiting forces agreement.
- November 4 – A Super Huey helicopter of the Philippine Air Force conducting disaster reconnaissance in the aftermath of Typhoon Kalmaegi (Tino) crashes in Loreto, Agusan del Sur, killing six people.
- November 5:
  - The Supreme Court releases a July 8 ruling declaring that COMELEC cannot automatically declare electoral candidates who received a small number of votes as nuisance candidates following a case filed by a congressional candidate in Lanao del Sur.
  - President Marcos signs Proclamation No. 1077, declaring a state of national calamity for a year, mainly due to damage caused by Typhoon Tino and in preparation for Typhoon Fung-wong (Super Typhoon Uwan). From November 4–6, local declarations are made in Bacolod, Cebu City, Cebu Province, Dinagat Islands, Negros Occidental, Palawan, Southern Leyte, and parts of Eastern Samar. At least 269 people are killed by Tino, while 523 are injured and 113 others are reported missing.
- November 6 – The Sandiganbayan releases an October 24 ruling acquitting former Masbate governor Rizalina Seachon-Lanete and Janet Lim-Napoles of plunder over the PDAF scam, but finds Napoles guilty on seven counts of graft and sentences her to up to eight years’ imprisonment and a fine of P107 million.
- November 7 – The Sandiganbayan convicts former Capalonga, Camarines Norte mayor Senandro Jalgalado of graft over the falsification of orders for medicines valued at P1.8 million in 2012 and sentences him to up to 30 years' imprisonment.
- November 9 – Super Typhoon Uwan makes landfall over Dinalungan, Aurora, leaving at least 28 people dead, 52 injured and two missing. A state of calamity is declared in Aurora, Albay, Camarines Sur, Eastern Samar, Northern Samar, Nueva Vizcaya and Pangasinan.
- November 17 – Flood control projects controversy: Executive secretary Lucas Bersamin and budget secretary Amenah Pangandaman resign over their alleged involvement in flood control corruption. Finance secretary Ralph Recto replaces Bersamin as executive secretary.
- November 20 – A court in Pasig convicts dismissed Bamban, Tarlac mayor Alice Guo of human trafficking and sentences her to life imprisonment.
- November 21 – An order from the National Telecommunications Commission on the long-overdue full transition of the country's television industry to digital broadcasts takes effect, commencing with the shutdown of all analog broadcasts in Mega Manila which is expected in November 2026.
- November 24 – The Sandiganbayan dismisses an ill-gotten wealth case filed in 1987 against former Occidental Mindoro governor and representative Josephine Sato, citing inordinate delay.
- November 25
  - COMELEC issues Resolution No. 11181, setting the first Bangsamoro Parliament election on March 30, 2026.
  - The Supreme Court rules that fugitives from the law are not entitled to seek judicial relief unless they are in custody following a grave coercion case involving Vallacar Transit.
- November 26 – A speeding truck collides with a UV Express van traveling from Nabua to Legazpi, in Camalig, Albay, killing 11 of the latter vehicle's 14 passengers. Four other individuals are injured.
- November 30 – The second edition of the Trillion Peso March is held across the Philippines.

=== December ===
- December 1 – The House of Representatives votes 249-5 with 11 abstentions to impose a 60-day suspension on Cavite 4th district representative Kiko Barzaga for disorderly behavior regarding several of his social media posts that were deemed inappropriate.
- December 2 – A state of calamity is declared in Naujan, Oriental Mindoro due to flooding caused by Typhoon Koto (Verbena) in November.
- December 3 – The Supreme Court unanimously votes in favor with the return of ₱60 billion taken by the government from the Philippine Health Insurance Corporation (PhilHealth), and affirms as well the temporary restraining order it has been issued against the transfer of the ₱29.9 billion unused PhilHealth funds to the national treasury.
- December 4 – The Supreme Court rules that votes cast for nuisance candidates are spoiled votes and should not be included in tallies for other candidates in a case involving elections to the Cavite Provincial Board in 2022.
- December 5 – The Sandiganbayan acquits 11 former Philippine National Police officials, including its chief Alan Purisima, and five incorporators of Werfast Documentary Agency of graft in connection with the alleged anomalous ₱100-million courier service contract in 2011 for the delivery of firearms licenses to applicants, citing the failure of the Ombudsman to prove their guilt.
- December 8 – The Sandiganbayan releases its November 21 decision that convicts and sentences Janet Lim-Napoles and three others to reclusion perpetua in two malversation cases of the PDAF scam involving ₱19-million in public funds allotted to former Benguet representative Samuel Dangwa. The court also convicts them in another case, giving them lighter penalties.
- December 9–10 – Manibela holds a nationwide transportation strike in protest against government abuses and neglect on jeepney drivers.
- December 10 – The province of Isabela is declared "insurgency-free" by the government.
- December 11 – Lawyers representing 103 survivors of Typhoon Rai (Super Typhoon Odette) in 2021 file a lawsuit in the United Kingdom against Shell plc for damages related to climate change caused by the energy firm's carbon emissions.
- December 12:
  - The Sandiganbayan acquits former Quezon City mayor Herbert Bautista of graft over the awarding of a P25-million contract to refurbish a government-owned property in 2012.
  - Three Filipino fishermen are injured after the China Coast Guard fires water cannons on two fishing boats near Sabina Shoal.
- December 18 – Contractor Sarah Discaya is arrested by the National Bureau of Investigation (NBI). Discaya, who has surrendered at the NBI headquarters in Pasay on December 9, along with nine other individuals, is facing graft and malversation charges linked to the anomalous flood control project in Jose Abad Santos, Davao Occidental.
- December 22 – The Supreme Court makes public its decision to affirm the conviction of three police officers for the 2017 murder of Kian delos Santos in an anti-drug operation in Caloocan.

== Holidays ==
In August 2024, the Senate discussed reducing holidays to boost productivity during the remaining sessions of Congress, with a focus on legislation addressing the number of holidays from different cities, municipalities, provinces including those of national level (besides religious) in the country.

On October 31, the national government publicly released the list of holidays and non-working days, which are indicated by proclamations signed by the president a day earlier. Proclamation No. 727, series of 2024, contains the general list, with the People Power anniversary, which was not declared a holiday for 2024, being returned but as a working day. A day prior to All Saints' Day (October 31) is included in the list, while All Souls' Day (November 2) is excluded.

Meanwhile, Proclamation No. 729, s. 2024, declared July 27 as a special non-working day in commemoration of the founding anniversary of the Iglesia ni Cristo.

=== Regular ===
- January 1 – New Year's Day
- April 1 – Eidul Fitr
- April 9 – Araw ng Kagitingan (Day of Valor)
- April 17 – Maundy Thursday
- April 18 – Good Friday
- May 1 – Labor Day
- June 6 – Eidul Adha
- June 12 – Independence Day
- August 25 – National Heroes Day
- November 30 – Bonifacio Day
- December 25 – Christmas Day
- December 30 – Rizal Day

=== Special (Non-working) days ===
- January 27 – Isra Wal Mi’ra (for Muslim Filipinos only)
- January 29 – Chinese New Year
- April 19 – Black Saturday
- May 12 – National and location elections (Through Proclamation No. 878)
- July 27 – Iglesia ni Cristo Founding Anniversary (Through Proclamation No. 729)
- August 21 – Ninoy Aquino Day
- October 31 – All Saints' Day Eve
- November 1 – All Saints Day
- December 8 – Feast of the Immaculate Conception
- December 24 – Christmas Eve
- December 31 – Last Day of the Year

=== Special (Working) day ===
- February 25 – EDSA People Power Revolution Anniversary
- November 7 – Sheikh Karim'ul Makhdum Day

== Entertainment and culture ==
=== January ===
- January 11 – Leean Jame Santos finishes in the Top 25 at Miss Tourism World 2024 in China.
- January 24 – Charyzah Esparrago of Quezon City is crowned Miss Supermodel Worldwide Philippines 2025 in the pageant's coronation night held at the Newport Performing Arts Theatre in Pasay.

=== February ===
- February 10 – Dia Maté wins Reina Hispanoamericana 2024 in Bolivia.
- February 19 – The Tandang Sora Women's Museum, the country's first women's museum, opens at the Tandang Sora National Shrine in Quezon City.

=== March ===
- March 2 – The Santa Ursula Parish Church in Binangonan, Rizal, is officially declared a national cultural treasure by the National Commission for Culture and the Arts.
- March 9 – Xena Ramos finishes as fourth runner-up at Miss Global 2024 in Thailand.
- March 14 – Four colonial-era panels stolen from Boljoon Church in Cebu in the 1980s are returned by the National Museum of the Philippines, which received the panels as part of a private donation.
- March 20 – President Marcos vetoes a bill recognizing Pampanga as the "culinary capital of the Philippines", citing a lack of historical basis and concerns over offending other provinces.
- March 21 – The Philippines wins the Guinness World Record for the Longest Line of Noodle Bowls, featuring 6,549 servings of Pancit Malabon, at an event in Malabon.
- March 27 – Associated Press photojournalist Noel Celis is named as a recipient in the 2025 World Press Photo Awards for his coverage of typhoons in October and November 2024.
- March 31 – Angelique Songco, a ranger at the Tubbataha Reefs Natural Park in Palawan, is named as a recipient in the 2025 International Women of Courage Award by the US Department of State.

=== April ===
- April 19 – Alexie Brooks wins Miss Eco International 2025 in Egypt.
- April 28 – Kirk Bondad is crowned Mister Pilipinas International 2025 in the pageant's coronation night held at the Newport Performing Arts Theatre in Pasay.
- April 30 – The Fernando Poe Jr. Film Collection is included in the UNESCO list for the Memory of the World Programme.

=== May ===
- May 2 – Ahtisa Manalo of Quezon is crowned Miss Universe Philippines 2025 at the pageant's coronation night at the Mall of Asia Arena in Pasay.
- May 12 – Francine Tajanlangit wins Miss Elite Global 2025 in India.
- May 23:
  - Krishan Pauline Alerre wins Miss Aura International 2025 in Turkey.
  - Patricia Anne Nichole Bangug wins Miss Orient Tourism Global 2025 in Malaysia.
- May 31 – Krishnah Gravidez finishes in the Top 8 at Miss World 2025 in India.

=== June ===
- June 3 – CJ Opiaza is formally crowned Miss Grand International 2024 following the resignation of India's Rachel Gupta.
- June 10 – A court in Manila acquits drag artist Pura Luka Vega on charges of offending moral and religious sensibilities over a rendition of the Lord's Prayer in 2023, citing failure to establish reasonable guilt.
- June 15 – Katrina Anne Johnson of Davao del Norte is crowned Binibining Pilipinas 2025 in the pageant's coronation night held at the Araneta Coliseum in Quezon City, while Annabelle Mae McDonnell of Iligan is crowned Binibining Pilipinas Globe.
- June 18 – President Marcos signs into law Republic Act No. 12224 designating February 1 as the National Day of Awareness on Hijab and other Traditional Garments and Attire.
- June 28:
  - Tarah Valencia finishes third runner-up at Miss Supranational 2025 in Poland.
  - Kenneth Vincent Cabungcal finishes fourth runner-up at Mister Supranational 2025 in Poland.

=== July ===
- July 9 – Anne Patricia Lorenzo is crowned Miss International Queen Philippines 2025 in the pageant's coronation night held at the SM Mall of Asia Arena in Pasay.
- July 21 – Claw King, a claw machine in Cebu City measuring 49.90 cubic meters (1,761 cubic feet), is recognized by the Guinness World Record as the world’s largest claw machine.

=== August ===
- August 9 – Meridith Bobadilla finishes second runner-up at Miss Teen Earth 2025 in India.
- August 10:
  - Joy Barcoma of Bacoor, Cavite is crowned Miss Earth Philippines 2025 at the pageant's coronation night held at the Okada Manila in Parañaque.
  - Jasmine Omay finishes in the Top 13 at Universal Woman 2025 in India.
- August 12 – Mindspark, the country's largest science museum, opens at Ayala Malls Manila Bay in Parañaque.
- August 24 – Emma Tiglao of Pampanga is crowned Miss Grand Philippines 2025 at the pageant's coronation night held at the SM Mall of Asia Arena in Pasay.
- August 29 – The Philippines wins the Guinness World Record for the largest number of people planting coconut seedlings simultaneously across multiple locations, with approximately 10,000 coconut seedlings planted across 11 barangays in San Pablo, Laguna.
- August 31 – Anna Margaret Mercado finishes in the Top 16 at Miss Teen International 2025 in India.

=== September ===
- September 25 – Kirk Bondad is crowned Mister International 2025 in Thailand.

=== October ===
- October 5 – Jether Palomo finishes at the Top 11 at Mister Global 2025 in Thailand.
- October 8 – Anita Gomez finishes as first runner-up at Miss Asia Pacific International 2025 at the Cebu Coliseum in Cebu City.
- October 14 – Sugar Mercado is crowned Mrs Universe 2025 in Laguna.
- October 15 – Annabelle Mae McDonnell finishes in the top 11 at Miss Globe 2025 in Albania.
- October 16 – The Philippines wins the Guinness World Record for the largest nut brittle created, with a 144.16 m^{2} (1,551.7 sq ft) product displayed at the Kasanggayahan Festival in Sorsogon City.
- October 18:
  - Emma Tiglao is crowned Miss Grand International 2025 in Thailand.
  - Eds Enero is crowned Miss Tourism Queen of the Year International at Miss Tourism International 2025 in Malaysia.
- October 30 – The Michelin Guide publishes its first restaurant listings in the Philippines and awards nine restaurants Michelin Stars.
- October 31 – Dumaguete and Quezon City are designated as members of the Creative Cities Network by UNESCO.

=== November ===
- November 5 – Joy Barcoma finishes as one of the four runners-up of Miss Earth 2025 at Okada Manila in Parañaque.
- November 10 – The Sibugay Wetland Nature Reserve in Zamboanga Sibugay is designated as an East Asian-Australasian Flyway Partnership Flyway Network Site.
- November 21:
  - Ahtisa Manalo finishes as third runner-up at Miss Universe 2025 in Thailand.
  - The Balinsasayao Twin Lakes Natural Park in Negros Oriental is designated as an ASEAN Heritage Park.
- November 27 – Myrna Esguerra finishes as fourth runner-up at Miss International 2025 in Japan.
- November 30:
  - Nikki Buenafe Cheveh is crowned Face of Beauty International 2025 in Taiwan.
  - The Philippines wins the Guinness World Record for the most condoms donated in an hour, with 13,312 specimen used at a celebration of World AIDS Day organized by DKT International and Watsons at the University of the Philippines Diliman in Quezon City.

=== December ===
- December 9 – Asín tibuok, an artisanal sea salt originating from Bohol, is recognized as Intangible Cultural Heritage in Need of Urgent Safeguarding by UNESCO.
- December 12:
  - Cyrille Payumo finishes in the Top 20 at Miss Charm 2025 in Vietnam.
  - The Velarde map and the Philippine Declaration of Independence are officially declared as national cultural treasures by the National Library of the Philippines.
- December 20 – Chelsea Fernandez finishes as first runner-up at Miss Cosmo 2025 in Vietnam.

== Deaths ==
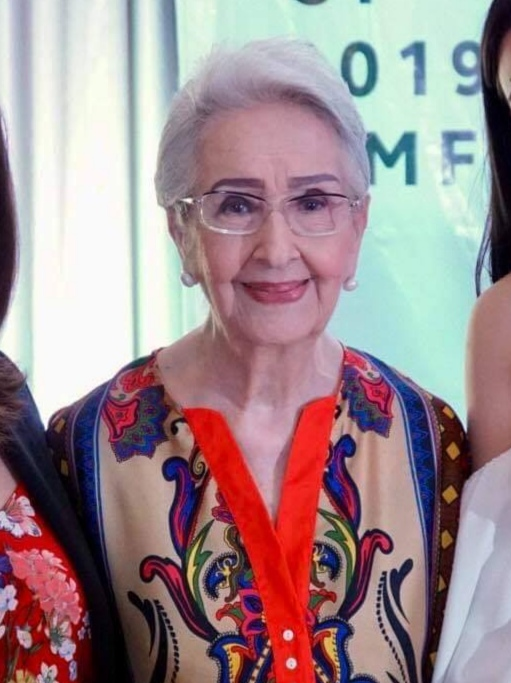
Gloria Romero

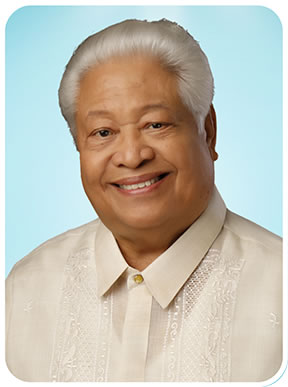
Edcel Lagman

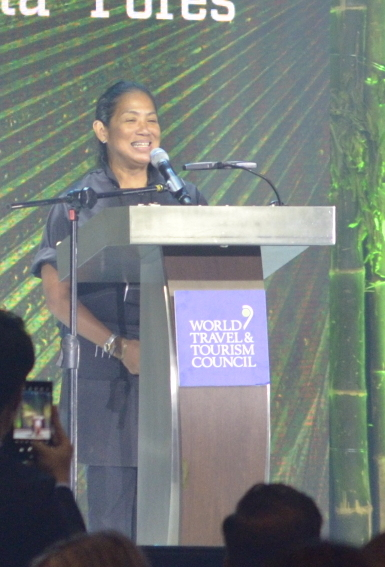
Margarita Forés

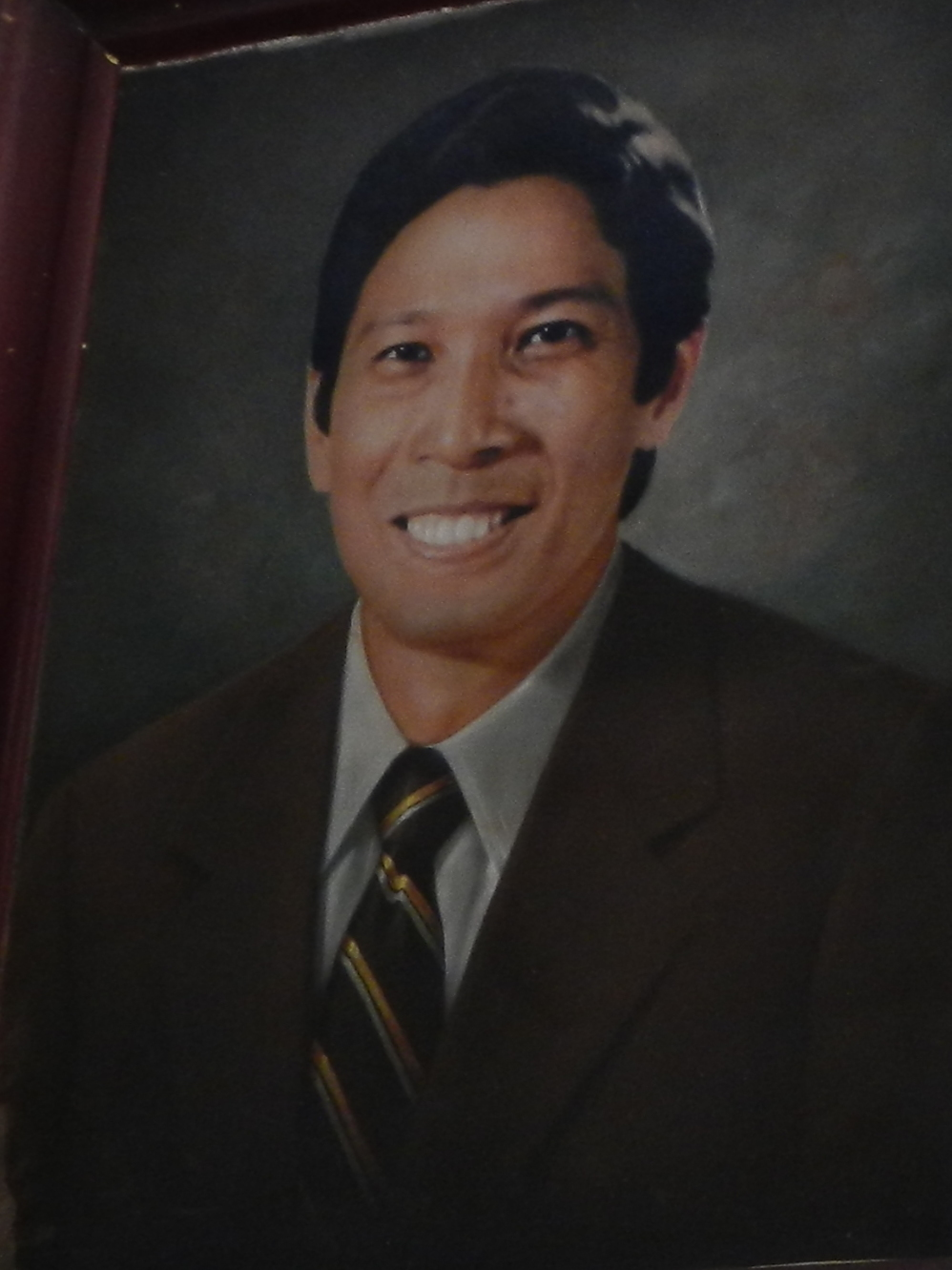
Eduardo Nonato Joson

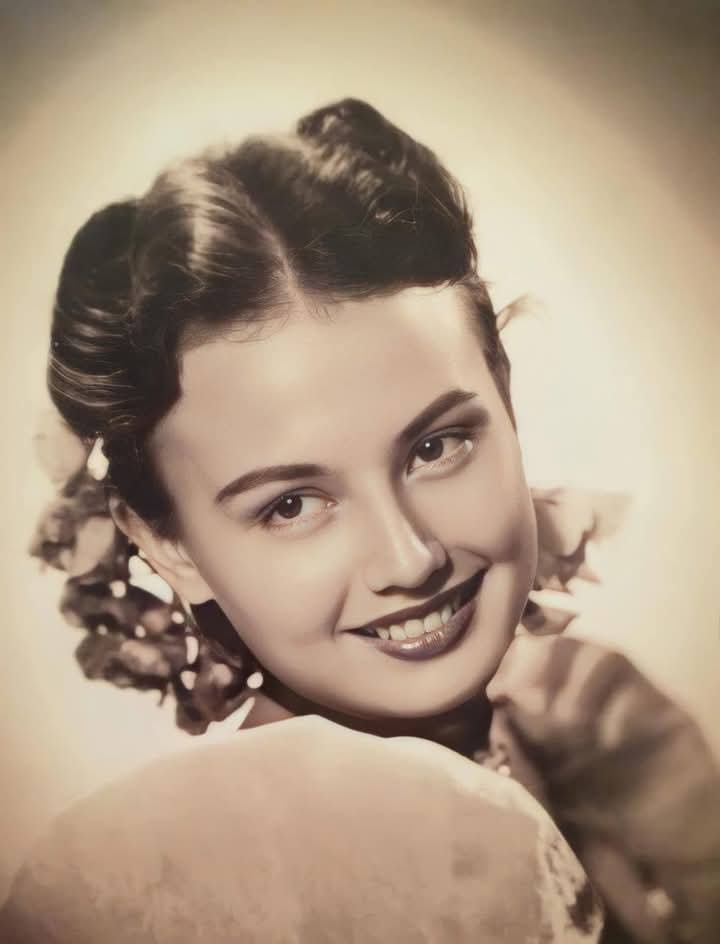
Delia Razon

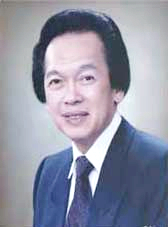
Estelito Mendoza

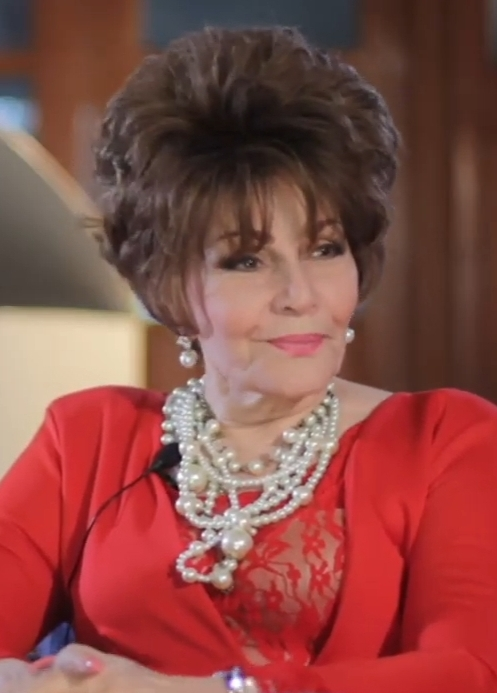
Pilita Corrales

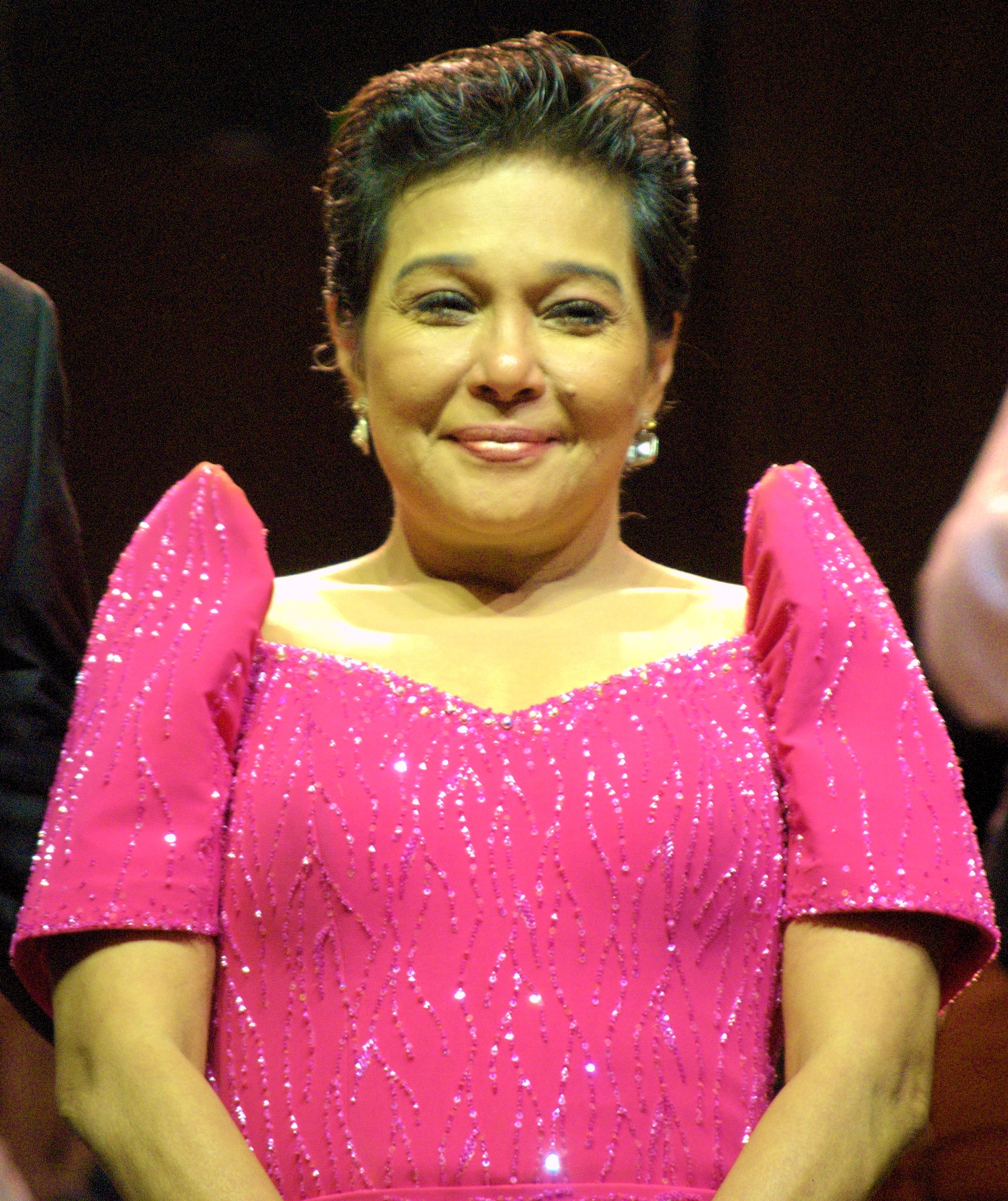
Nora Aunor

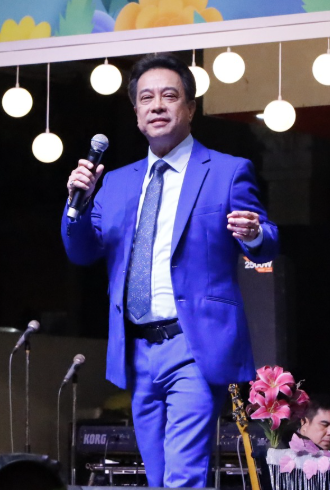
Hajji Alejandro

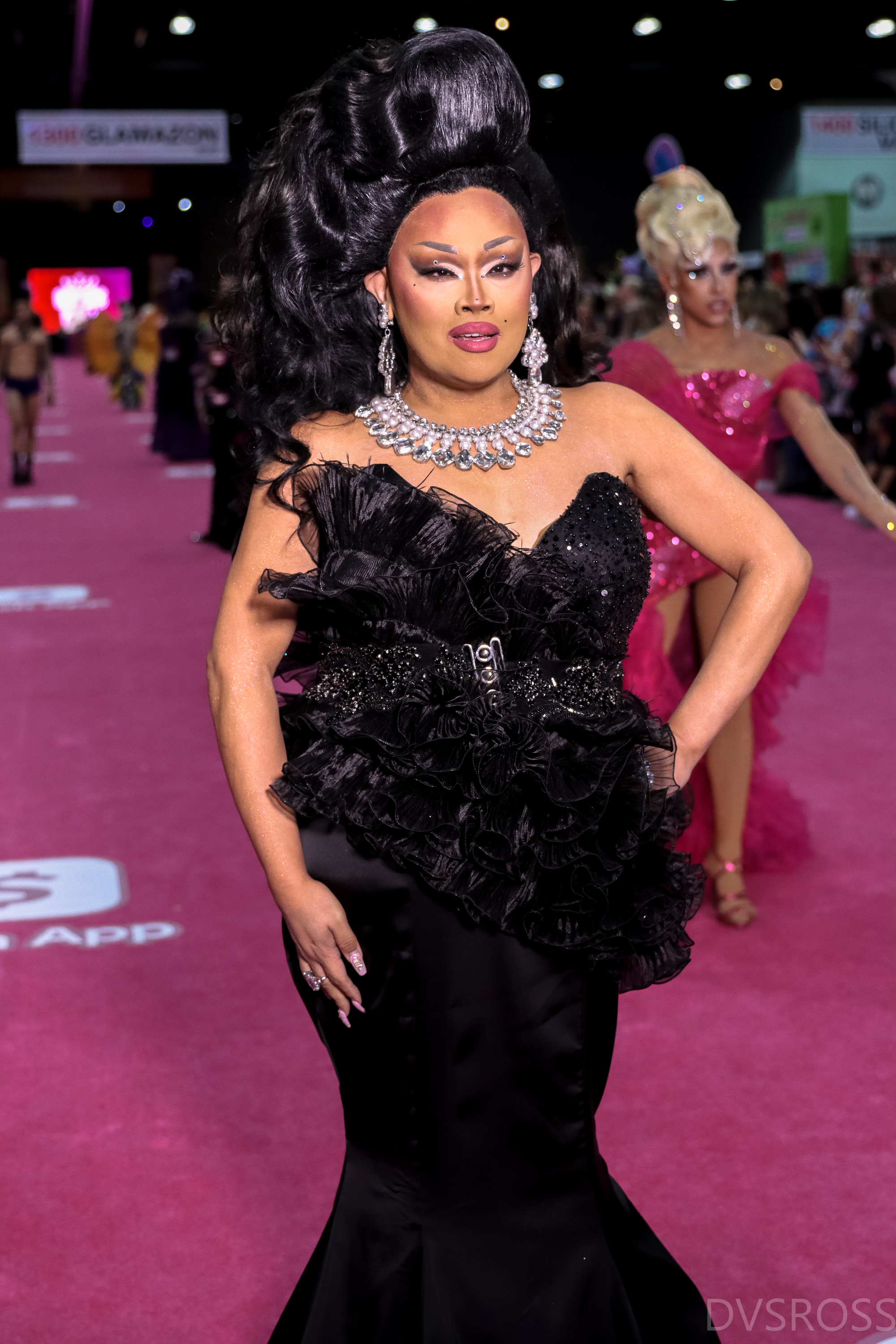
Jiggly Caliente

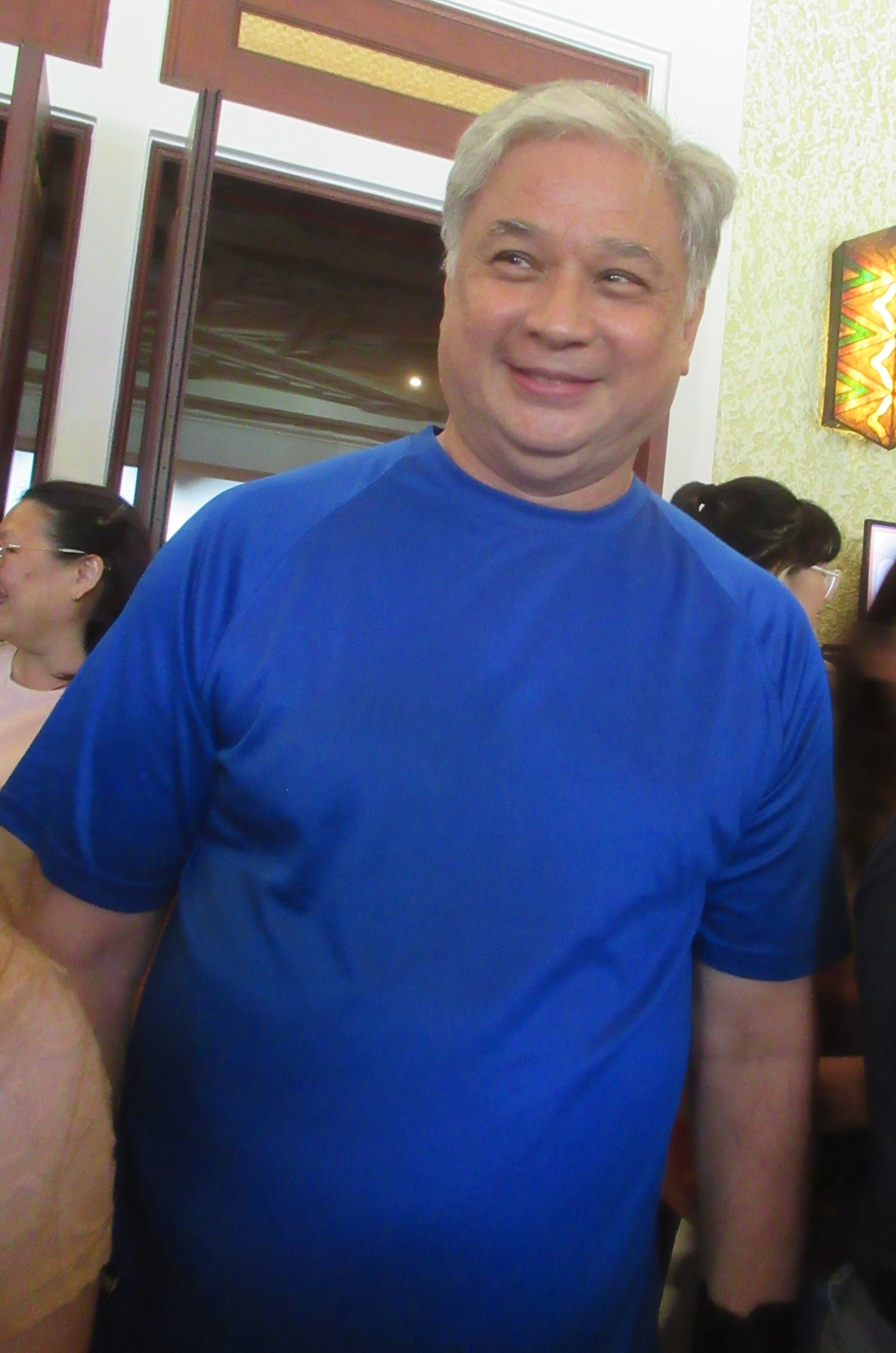
Ricky Davao

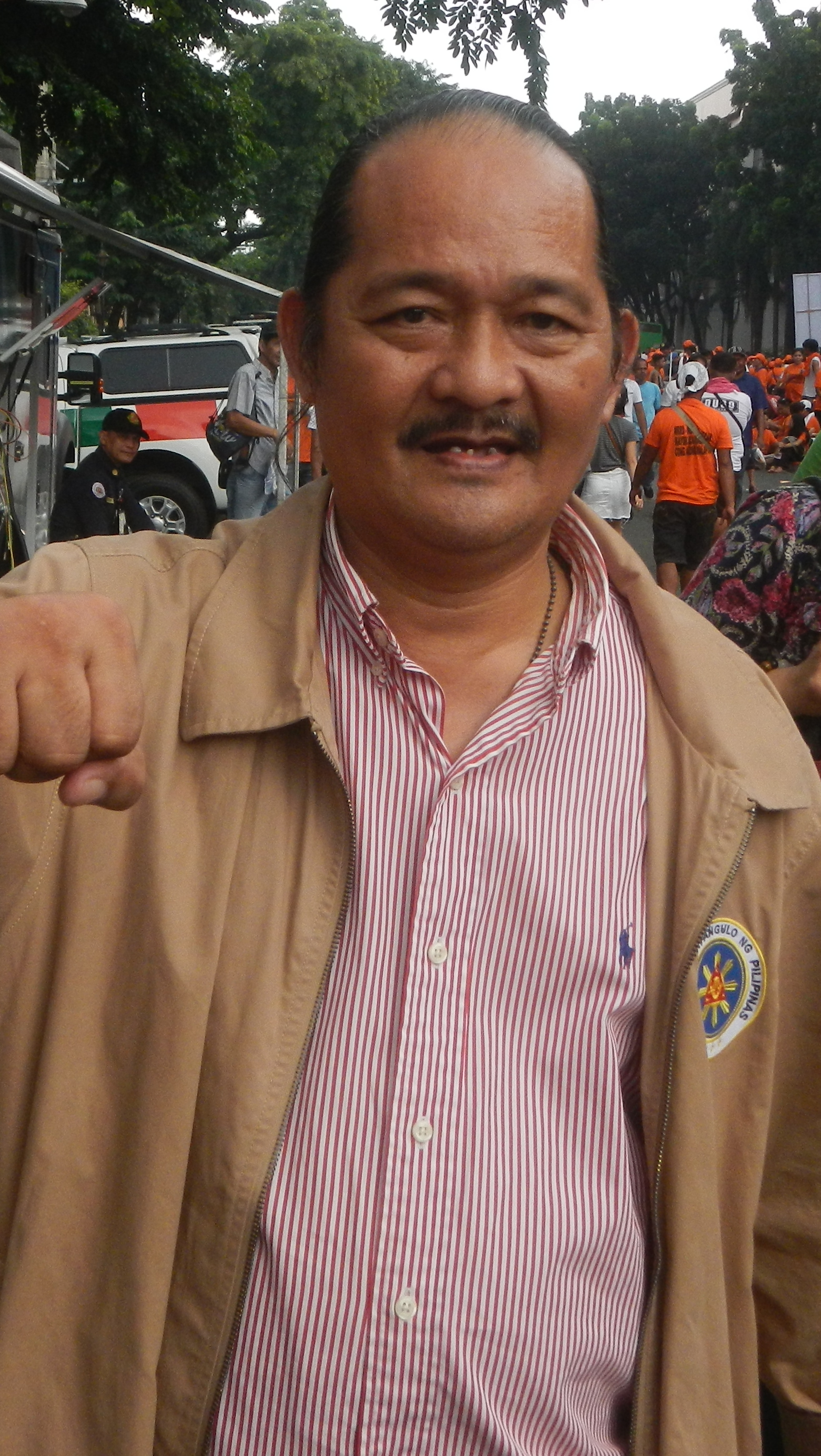
Amay Bisaya

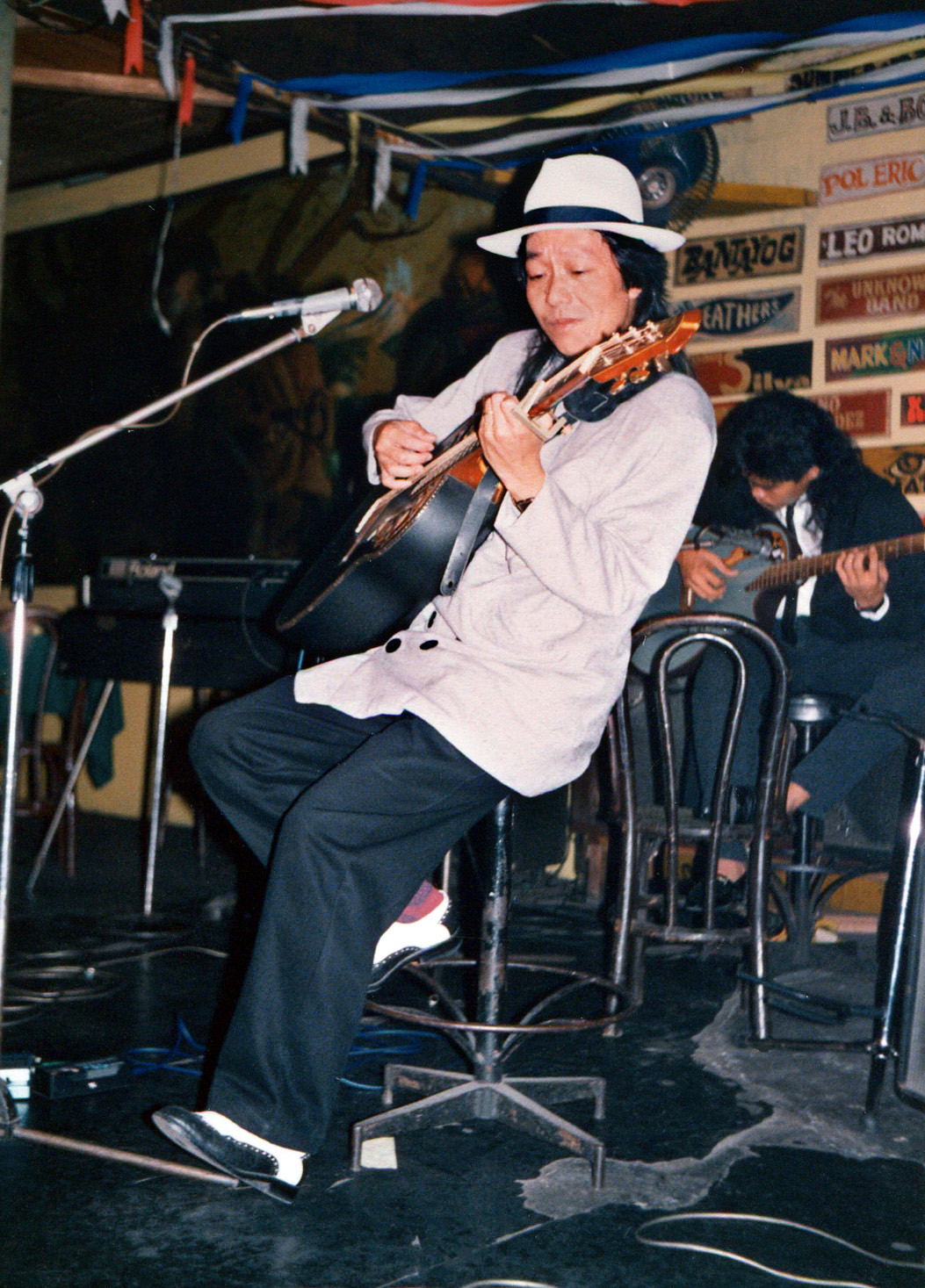
Freddie Aguilar

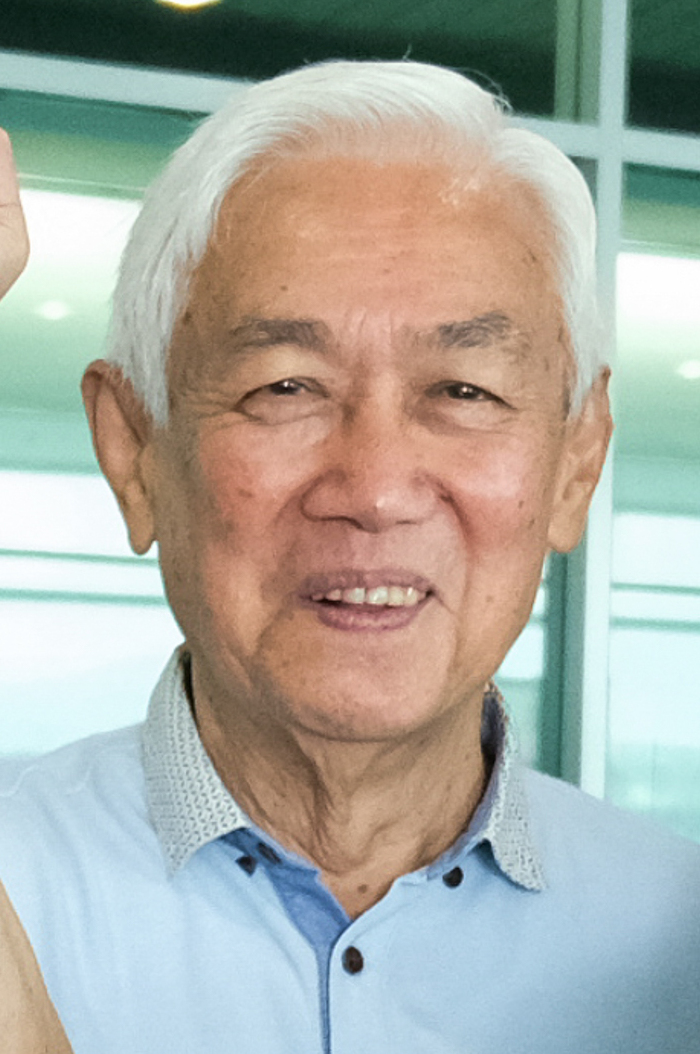
Luis Jalandoni

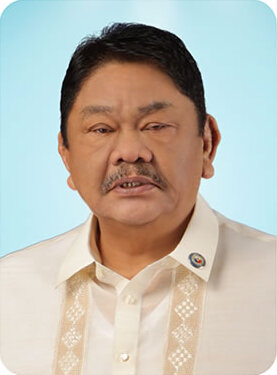
Reynaldo Tamayo Sr.

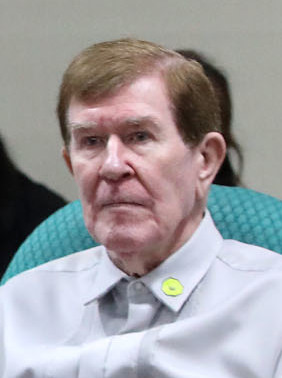
Bruce McTavish

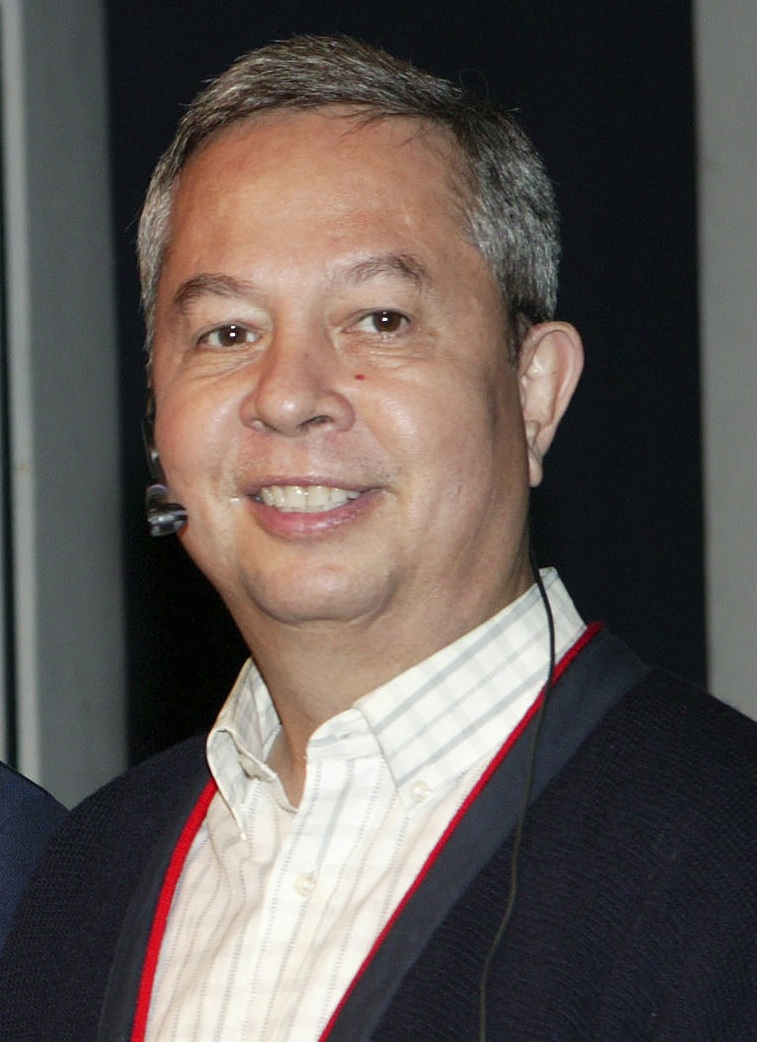
Nicanor Perlas

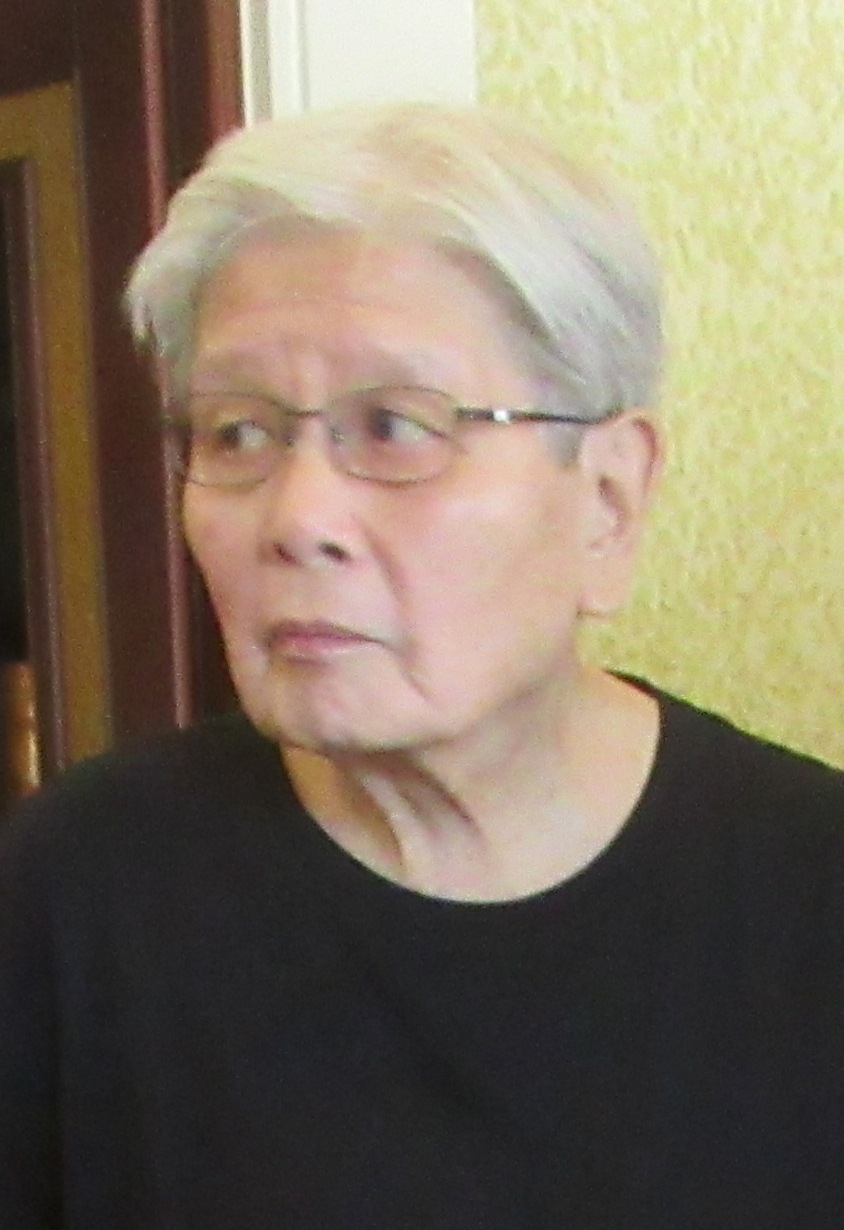
Mike de Leon

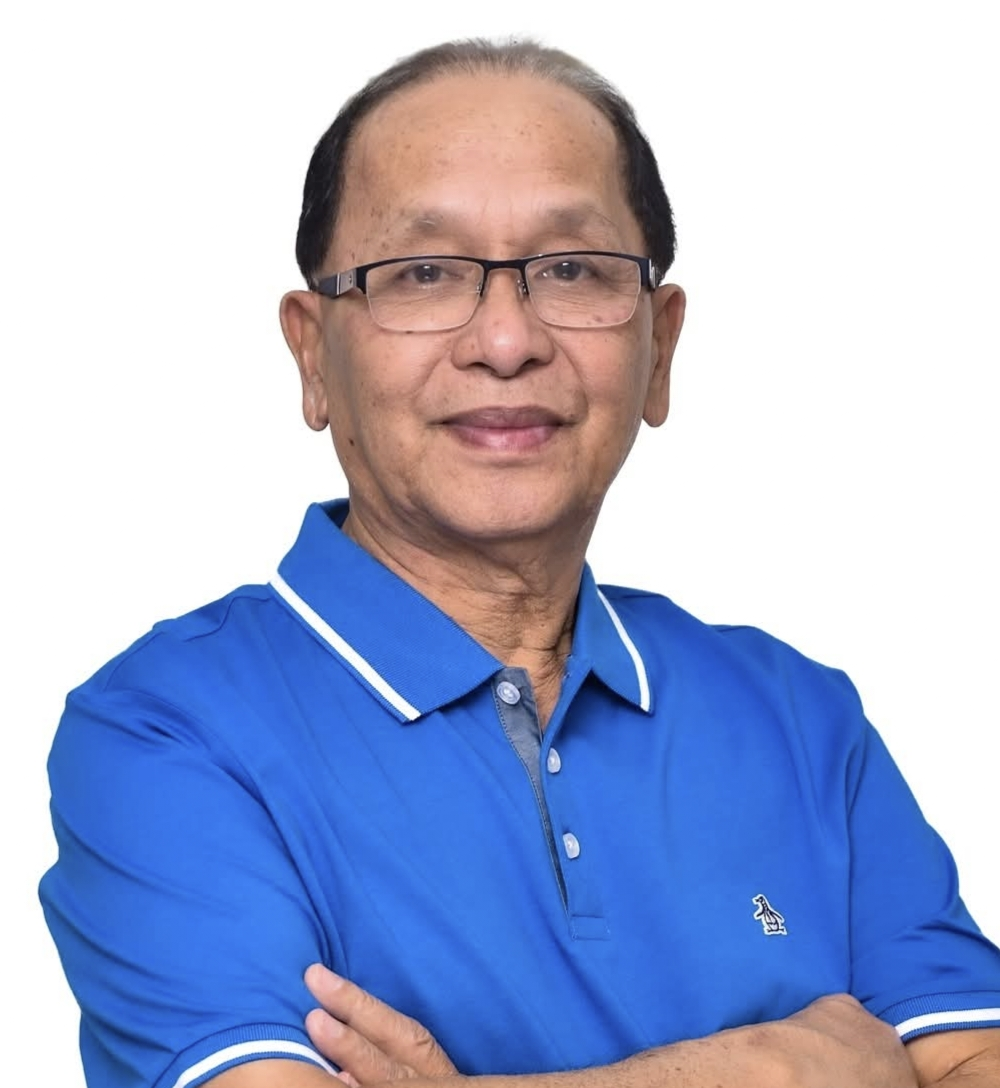
Reynante Tolentino

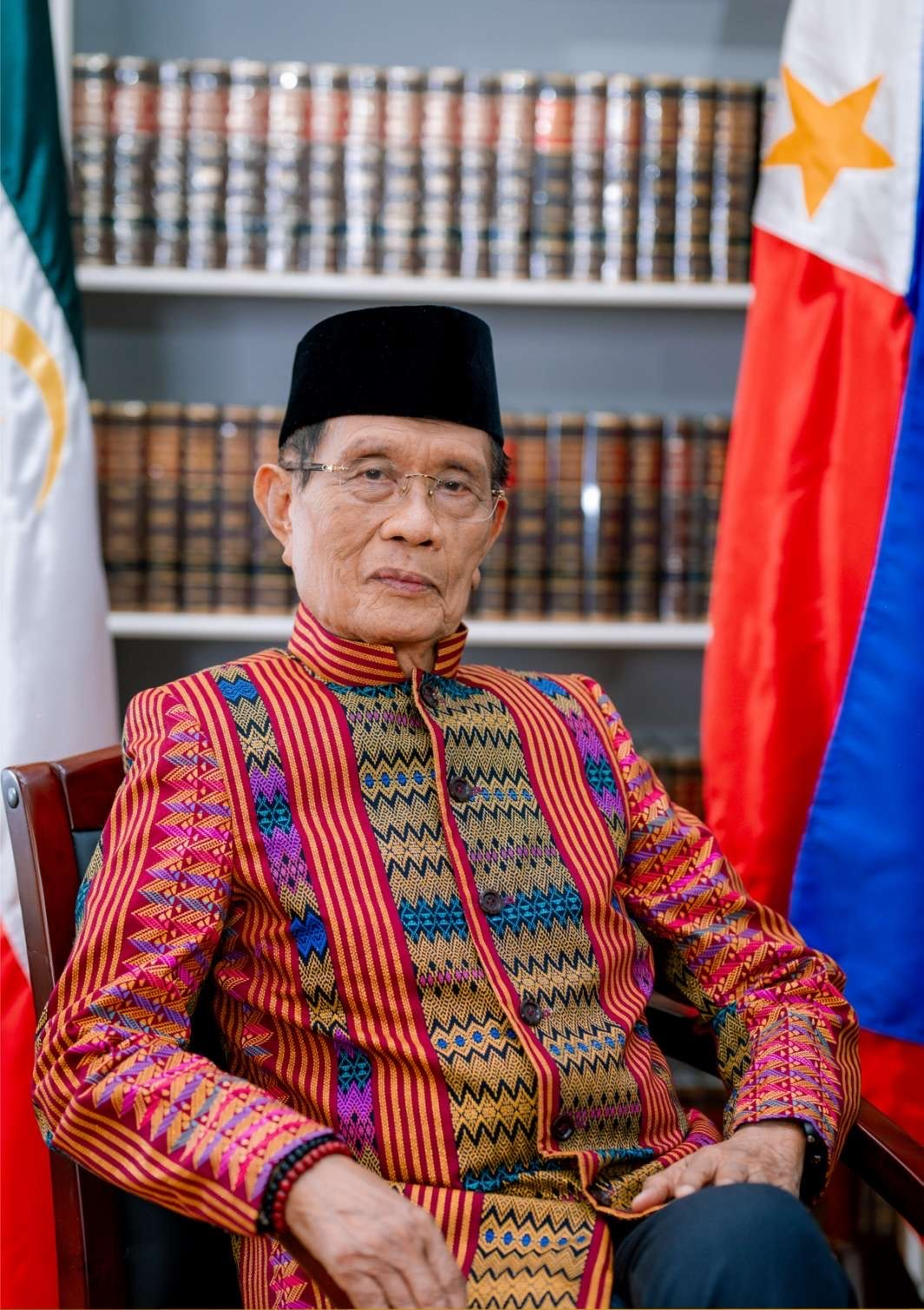
Pangalian Balindong

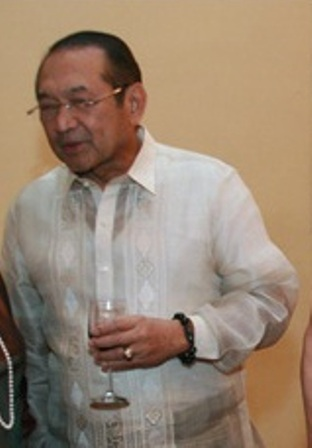
Eduardo Ermita

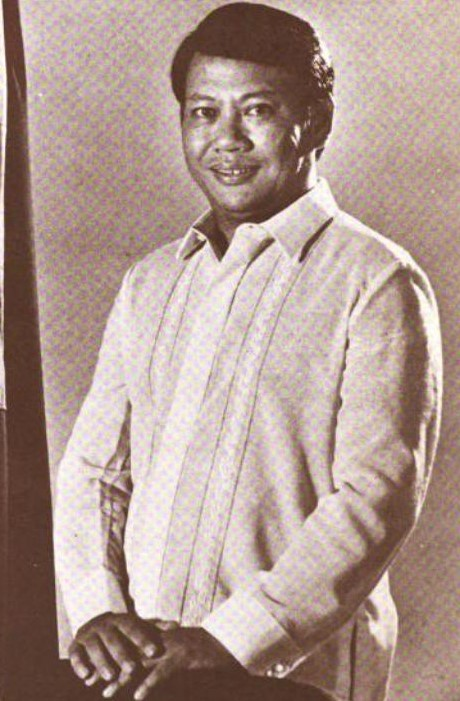
Felicito Payumo

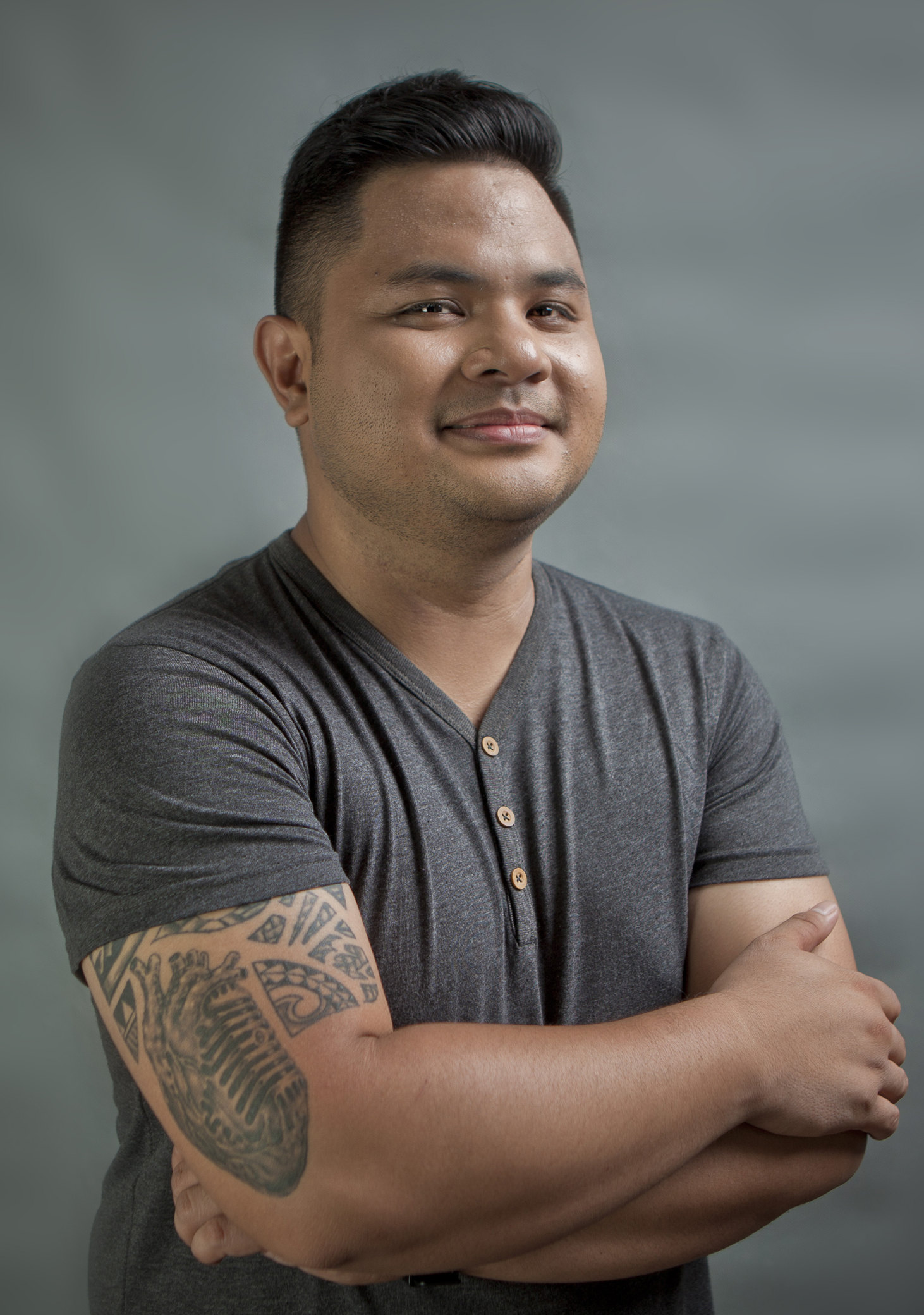
Davey Langit

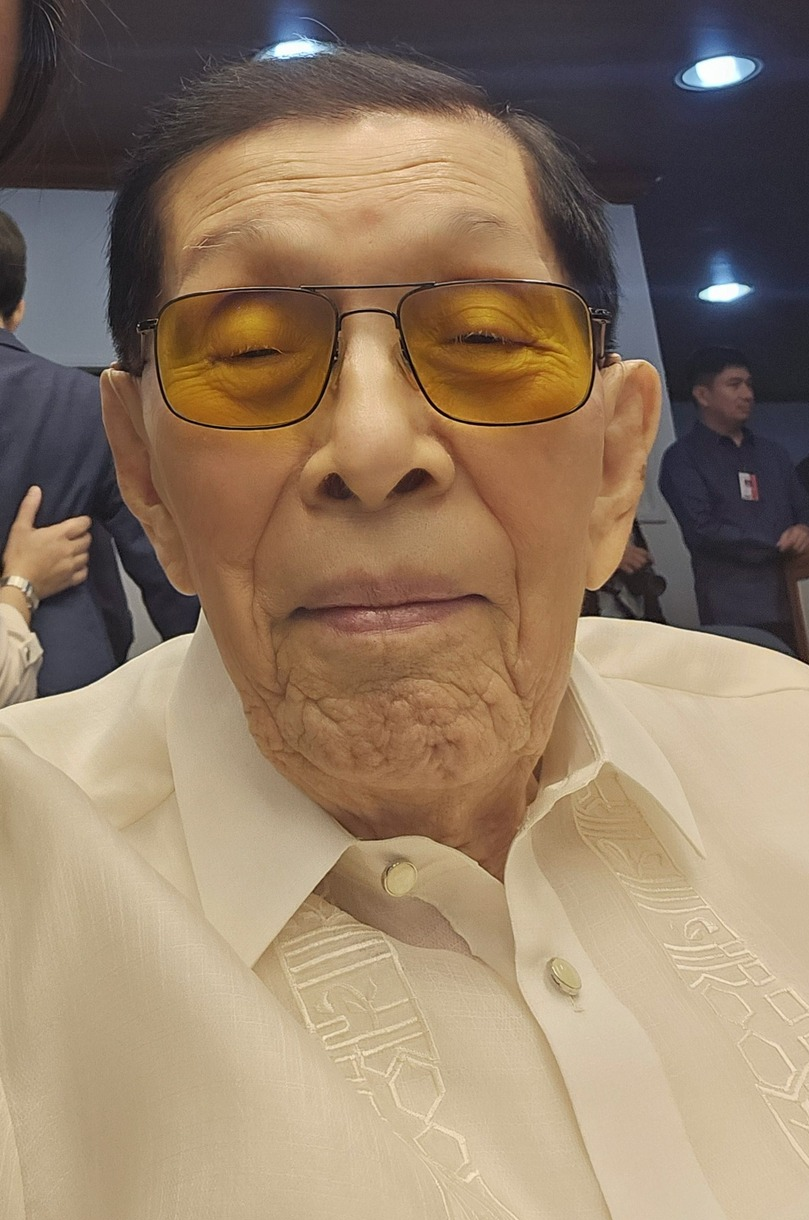
Juan Ponce Enrile

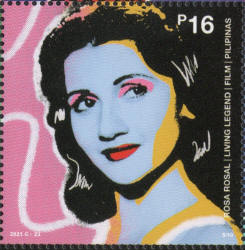
Rosa Rosal

Alonzo Saclag

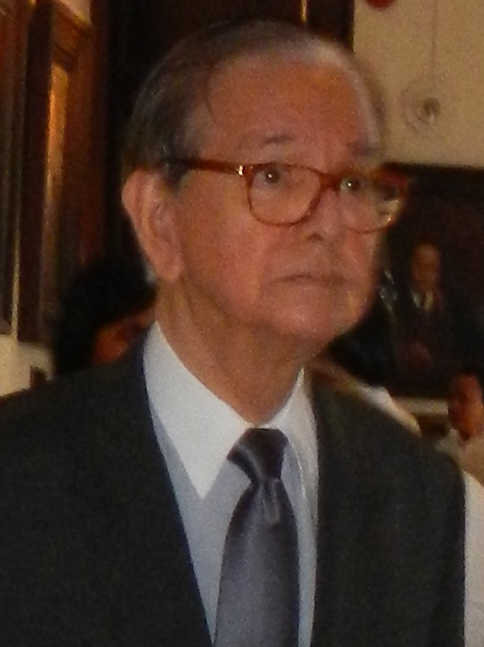
Bernardo P. Pardo

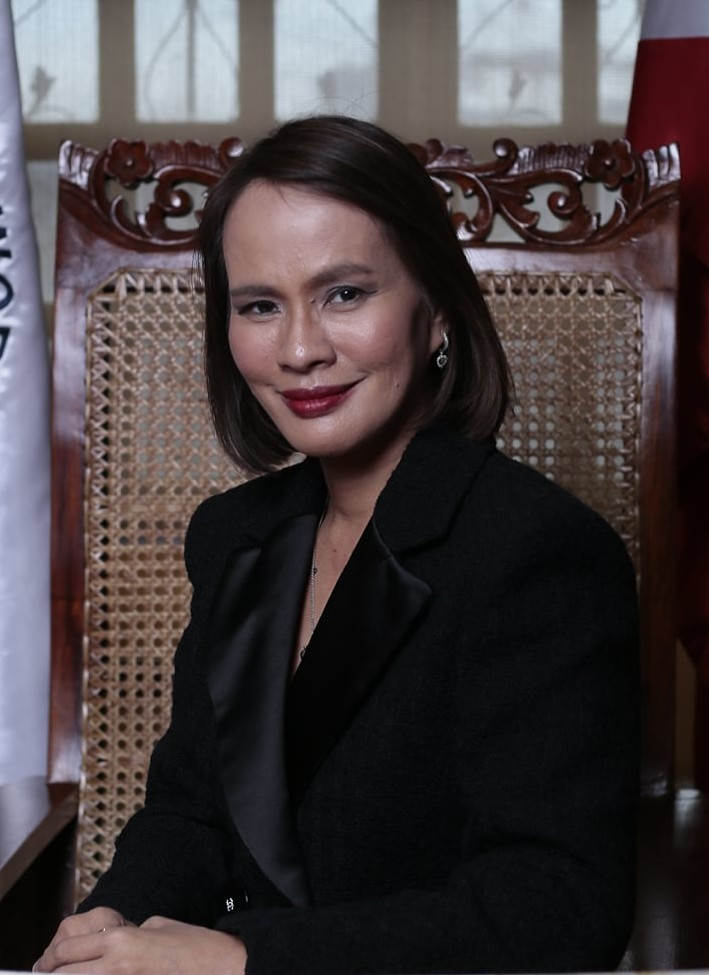
Cathy Cabral

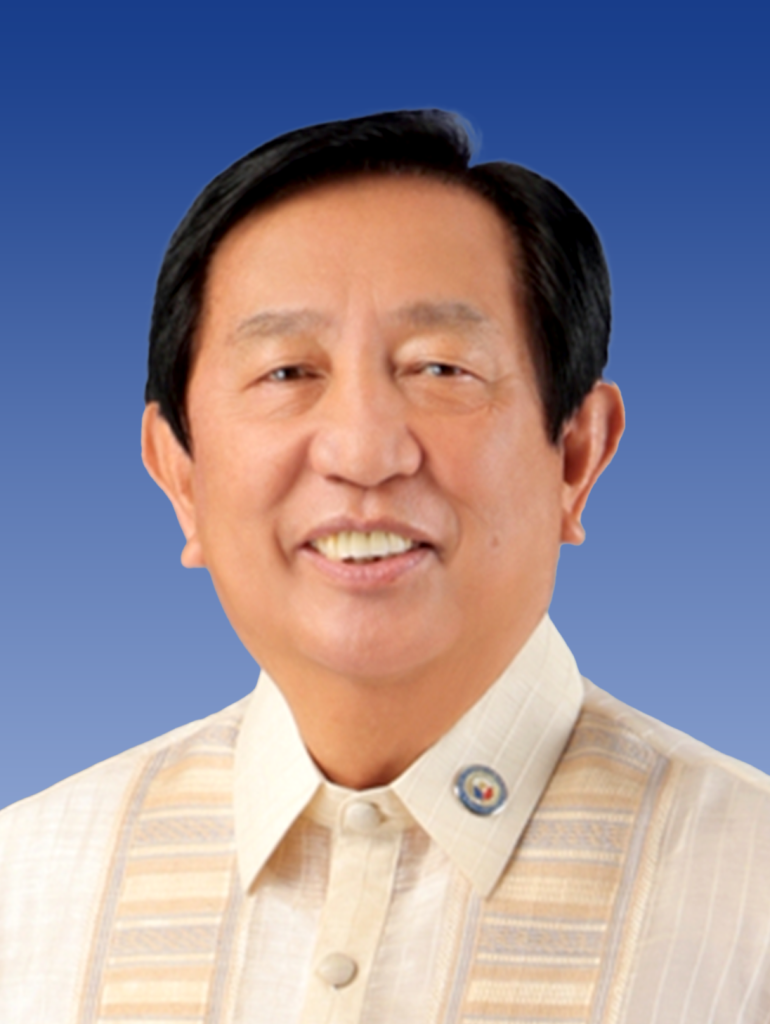
Romeo Acop

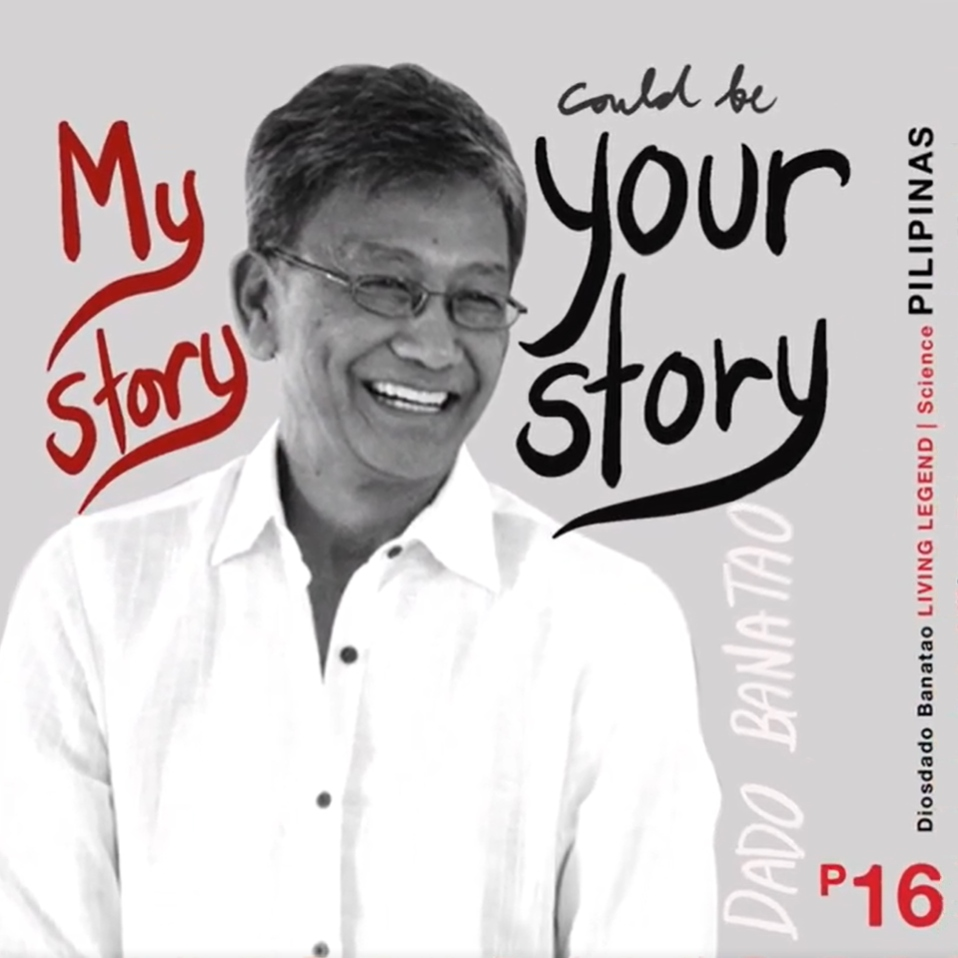
Dado Banatao

=== January ===
- January 6 – Mervin Guarte (b. 1992), obstacle course racer (Southeast Asian Games multiple medalist)
- January 7 – Deogracias Victor Savellano (b. 1959), undersecretary of the Department of Agriculture (since 2023), governor of Ilocos Sur (1992, 2001–2004 and 2007–2010), and representative of the 1st district of Ilocos Sur (2016–2022)
- January 25 – Gloria Romero (b. 1933), actress
- January 30:
  - Sammy Acaylar (b. 1958), volleyball coach (Perpetual Altas, Quezon City Gerflor Defenders, men's national team)
  - Edcel Lagman (b. 1942), House Minority Leader (2010–2012), representative of the 1st district of Albay (1987–1998, 2004–2013 and since 2016), and president of the Liberal Party (since 2022)

=== February ===
- February 11 – Margarita Forés (b. 1959), chef and restaurateur
- February 14 – Matutina (b. 1946), comedian
- February 25 – Alberto Lina (b. 1948), commissioner of the Bureau of Customs (2015–2016)

=== March ===
- March 8 – Oscar Calderon (b. 1951), chief of the Philippine National Police (2006–2007)
- March 12 – Eduardo Nonato Joson (b. 1950), governor (1995–1998) and representative of the 1st district of Nueva Ecija (1987–1992 and 2007–2010)
- March 15 – Delia Razon (b. 1931), actress
- March 16 – Gold Dagal (b. 1986 or 1987), stand-up comedian
- March 18 – Edwin Borja (b. 1958), Olympic swimmer (1972, 1976)
- March 26 – Estelito Mendoza (b. 1930), solicitor general (1972–1986), Minister of Justice (1984–1986) and governor of Pampanga (1985–1986)
- March 29 – Virgilio Garcillano (b. 1937), commissioner of the Commission on Elections (2004–2005)

=== April ===
- April 7 – Vicki Brick (b. 1981), basketball player (Maryland Terrapins, women's national team) and businesswoman
- April 12 – Pilita Corrales (b. 1939), singer and actress
- April 16 – Nora Aunor (b. 1953), actress, singer, and National Artist for Film and Broadcast Arts
- April 21 – Hajji Alejandro (b. 1954), singer and composer
- April 27 – Jiggly Caliente (b. 1980), drag performer, singer and actress
- April 28 – Edgardo Espiritu (b. 1935), secretary of finance (1998–1999)

=== May ===
- May 1 – Ricky Davao (b. 1961), actor and director
- May 8 – Amay Bisaya (b. 1958), actor
- May 24 – Nestor Cariño (b. 1938), Roman Catholic prelate, bishop of Borongan (1980–1986) and Legazpi (2005–2007).
- May 27:
  - Freddie Aguilar (b. 1953), folk singer
  - Red Sternberg (b. 1974), actor (T.G.I.S.)

=== June ===
- June 7 – Luis Jalandoni (b. 1935), former Catholic priest and chair of the National Democratic Front of the Philippines (NDFP)
- June 16 – Cocoy Laurel (b. 1953), actor
- June 21 – Reynaldo Tamayo Sr. (b. 1952), representative of ANGAT partylist (since 2022)

=== July ===
- July 3 – Lolit Solis (b. 1947), talk show host (Startalk), talent manager and entertainment columnist
- July 7 – Juan Cutillas (b. 1942), Spanish-born football coach (Kaya, Philippines national team)
- July 16 – Bruce McTavish (b. 1939), New Zealand-born boxing referee
- July 21 – Fritz Ynfante (b. 1940), actor and director
- July 25 – Bayani Casimiro Jr. (b. 1968), comedian

=== August ===
- August 14 – Nicanor Perlas (b. 1950), environmentalist and presidential candidate (2010)
- August 28 – Mike de Leon (b. 1947), film director (Sister Stella L., Itim, Batch '81)

=== September ===
- September 22 – Reynante Tolentino (b. 1951), governor of Aurora (since 2024)
- September 24 – Angelito Antonio (b. 1939), painter and academic
- September 26 – Gregorio C. Brillantes (b. 1932), writer

=== October ===
- October 2 – Pangalian Balindong (b. 1940), member of the House of Representatives from the 2nd district of Lanao del Sur (1995–1998, 2007–2016) and speaker of the Bangsamoro Parliament (since 2019)
- October 17 – Lollie Mara (b. 1939), actress
- October 18 – Eduardo Ermita (b. 1935), executive secretary (2004–2010), secretary of National Defense (acting 2001; 2003–2004), representative of 1st district of Batangas (1992–2001)
- October 20 – Felicito Payumo (b. 1937), representative of the 1st district of Bataan (1987–1998), chair of the Subic Bay Metropolitan Authority (1998–2004) and the Bases Conversion and Development Authority (2011–2012)
- October 21:
  - Warlito Cajandig (b. 1944), Roman Catholic prelate, vicar apostolic of Calapan (1989–2022).
  - Davey Langit (b. 1986), singer-songwriter, musician and radio DJ
- October 22 – Emman Atienza (b. 2006), actress and social media personality
- October 26 (in the United States) – Patrick Dela Rosa (b. 1964), former actor and former member of the Quezon City Council and the Oriental Mindoro Provincial Board

=== November ===
- November 1 – Dondon Nakar (b. 1959), actor
- November 6 – Eduardo Gullas (b. 1930), House Majority Leader (2000), representative of the 1st district of Cebu (1969–1972, 1992–2001, 2004–2013 and 2019–2022), and governor of Cebu (1976–1986)
- November 13 – Juan Ponce Enrile (b. 1924), chief presidential legal counsel (since 2022), senate president (2008–2013), minority floor leader (2015–2016), senator (1987–1992; 1995–2001; and 2004–2016), minister of defense (1972–1986) and secretary of justice (1968–1970)
- November 15 – Rosa Rosal (b. 1928 (Note: Cited as 1929 or 1931 in some sources.)), actress and governor of the Philippine Red Cross
- November 29 – Alonzo Saclag (b. 1942), Kalinga musician, dancer and recipient of the National Living Treasures Award

=== December ===
- December 4 – Budoy Marabiles (b. 1971), musician
- December 7 – Jimmy Mariano (b. 1941), basketball player (Ysmael Steel Admirals) and coach (Great Taste Coffee Makers, UE Red Warriors)
- December 11 – Bernardo P. Pardo (b. 1932), associate justice of the Supreme Court (1998–2002) and Chairman of the Commission on Elections (1995–1998)
- December 13 – Jose Bantolo (b. 1960), Roman Catholic prelate, bishop of Masbate (since 2011)
- December 16 – Jefferson Utanes (b. 1979), voice actor and announcer
- December 18 – Cathy Cabral (b. 1962), undersecretary of the Department of Public Works and Highways (2014–2025)
- December 20:
  - Bing Davao (b. 1960), actor
  - Romeo Acop (b. 1947), director of the Criminal Investigation and Detection Group of the Philippine National Police (1994–1995) and representative of the 2nd district of Antipolo (2010–2019 and since 2022)
- December 22 – Philip Supnet (b. 1959), comedian
- December 25 – Dado Banatao (b. 1946), entrepreneur and engineer

== See also ==
=== Country overviews ===
- History of the Philippines
- History of the Philippines (1986–present)
- Outline of the Philippines
- Government of the Philippines
- Politics of the Philippines
- List of years in the Philippines
- Timeline of Philippine history

=== Related timelines for current period ===
- 2025
- 2025 in politics and government
- 2020s
