= Food and Drug Administration (Philippines) =

Department of Health regulatory agency

- Pangasiwaan ng Pagkain at Gamot

Agency overview
- Formed: June 22, 1963
- Jurisdiction: Philippines
- Headquarters: Civic Drive, Filinvest Corporate City, Alabang, Muntinlupa City 1781
- Employees: less than 900
- Agency executives: Atty. Paolo S. Teston, Director General; Atty. Ronald R. De Veyra, MBA, CESO II, Deputy Director General for Administration and Finance; Atty. Franklin Anthony M. Tabaquin, IV, Director III, Officer-in-Charge, Deputy Director General for Field Regulatory Operations Office
- Parent department: Department of Health
- Website: www.fda.gov.ph

The Food and Drug Administration (FDA) of the Philippines, formerly the Bureau of Food and Drugs (BFAD /ˈbiːfæd/; 1982–2009), is a health regulatory agency under the Department of Health. It was created in 1963 by Republic Act No. 3720, amended in 1987 by Executive Order 175 otherwise known as the "Food, Drugs and Devices, and Cosmetics Act", and subsequently reorganized by Republic Act No. 9711 otherwise known as "The Food and Drug Administration Act of 2009". The agency is responsible for licensing, monitoring, and regulation of cosmetics, drugs, foods, household hazardous products, medical devices and electromagnetic radiation emitting devices, pesticides, tobacco and related products, and vaccines for safety, efficacy, and quality in the Republic of the Philippines.

The Philippine FDA is led by the Director General appointed by the President of the Philippines and two deputies for Administration & Finance, and Field Regulatory Operations. Atty. Paolo S. Teston, is the current FDA Director General since June 1, 2025.

The FDA has its central office in Alabang, Muntinlupa. The agency has 4 centers located at its central office, and 5 clusters of field regulatory operations and 3 laboratories located throughout the archipelago. The agency also grants accreditation to private sector laboratories for testing of COVID-19.

== Organizational chart ==
- Department of Health
  - Food and Drug Administration
    - Office of the Director General
      - Center for Cosmetic and Household/Urban Hazardous Substances Regulation and Research (CCHUHSRR)
      - Center for Device Regulation, Radiation Health, and Research (CDRRHR)
      - Center for Drug Regulation and Research (CDRR)
      - Center for Food Regulation and Research (CFRR)
      - Common Services Laboratory
        - Alabang Testing and Quality Assurance Laboratory
        - Cebu Testing and Quality Assurance Laboratory
        - Davao Testing and Quality Assurance Laboratory
        - Physics Laboratory
      - Policy and Planning Office (PPO)
        - Training, Advocacy and Comminication Division
        - Policy and Public Affairs Division
        - Planning and Monitoring Division
      - Legal Services Support Center (LSSC)
        - Investigation Division
        - Litigation and Enforcement Division
        - Documentation, Opinion, and Contracts Review Division
        - Internal Affairs Division
      - Information and Communication Technology Management Division
      - Ad Hoc
        - Food and Drug Action Center (FDAC)
        - Strategic Programs and Special Concerns
        - International Regulatory Operations Policy Committee
        - Media Relations Office
    - Office of the Deputy Director General for Administrative and Finance
      - Administrative and Finance Office
        - Procurement Division
        - Assets and Finance Management Division
        - Property and Logistics Management Division
        - Human Resource Development Division
    - Office of the Deputy Director General for Field Regulatory Operations
      - Office of North Luzon Cluster (NLC)
      - Office of South Luzon Cluster (SLC)
      - Office of Visayas Cluster (VC)
      - Office of West Mindanao Cluster (MWC)
      - Office of East Mindanao Cluster (MEC)
      - Regulatory Enforcement Unit (REU)

== Agency mandate ==
As a regulatory agency under the Department of Health, the Food and Drug Administration, created under Republic Act No. 3720, series of 1963, as amended by Executive Order 175, series of 1987, otherwise known as the "Food, Drugs and Devices, and Cosmetics Act", and subsequently Republic Act No. 9711 otherwise known as "The Food and Drug Administration Act of 2009", is mandated to ensure the safety, efficacy or quality of health products which include food, drugs, cosmetics, devices, biologicals, vaccines, in-vitro diagnostic reagents, radiation-emitting devices or equipment, and household/urban hazardous substances, including pesticides and toys, or consumer products that may have an effect on health which require regulations as determined by the FDA.

Among others, the FDA is also mandated to enforce the provisions of the following laws:

- Republic Act (RA) No. 9502, or The Universally Accessible Cheaper and Quality Medicine Act of 2008
- RA No. 6675, or The Generics Act Of 1988,
- RA No.10918, or The Pharmacy Law,
- RA No. 9211, or The Tobacco Regulation Act of 2003
- RA No. 7394, or The Consumer Act of the Philippines
- RA No. 7581/10623, or The Price Act
- RA No.10611, or The Food Safety Act of 2013
- RA No. 8172, or The ASIN Law,
- RA No. 8203, or The Special Law on Counterfeit Drug
- RA No. 8976, or The Food Fortification Law
- RA No. 9165, or The Comprehensive Dangerous Drugs Act
- RA No. 9257, or The Expanded Senior Citizens Act of 2003
- PD No. 881, or The Household Hazardous Act
- EO No. 51, or The Milk Code of the Philippines
- RA No.10354, or The Responsible Parenthood and Reproductive Health Bill of 2012
- PD 856, or The Code of Sanitation of the Philippines

== History ==
Department of Health Secretary Francisco Duque, Sr. created a subcommittee on Food and Drugs in 1961–1962 to initiate an administration bill to Congress to enact a law that would ensure the safety, purity and quality of foods, drugs and cosmetics being made available to the public. The Subcommittee on Food and Drug was chaired by the then Undersecretary for Special Health Services, Dr. Rodolfo Caños, with members Dr. Trinidad Pesigan, Director of the Bureau of Research and Laboratories, Mr. Emilio Espinosa of the Bureau of Health Services, Ms. Amor Cita M. Pallera, Pharmacy Adviser, Office of the Secretary of Health, also as Secretary and Liaison to Congress. Thus, on June 22, 1963, Republic Act No. 3720 was passed into law known as the "Food, Drug and Cosmetic Act".

To carry out the provisions of Republic Act No. 3720, the Food and Drug Administration (FDA) was created with offices and laboratories constructed in the DOH San Lazaro Compound, Sta. Cruz, Manila at a cost of about Php 2.5M Million. The Food and Drug Administration became operational with the appointment of its first FDA Administrator, Ms. Luzonica M. Pesigan on May 25, 1966, to December 7, 1977, with Mr. Emilio Espinosa as deputy director. By Virtue of R.A. 3720, the powers, functions and duties of the Division of Food and Drug Testing of the Bureau of Research and Laboratories and the Board of Food Inspection, all personnel together with all their equipment, supplies, records, files and balance of appropriations were transferred to the FDA.

With the Integrated Reorganization Plan of 1973, the Narcotic Drugs Division, Bureau of Internal Revenue, Department of Finance was Transferred to the Food and Drug Administration headed by Ms. Conception M. Fernandez who retired in 1975 with Ms. Rita V. Caoile as the next chief of the same. Mrs. Catalina C. Sanchez took over as the next chief of the Narcotic Drugs Division in 1976.

On December 2, 1982, Executive Order No. 851 by Section 4, under the Minister of Health Hon. Jesus M. Azurin, The FDA was abolished and created the Bureau of Food and Drugs (BFAD). Mrs. Catalina C. Sanchez was appointed the first Director of the BFAD on February 20, 1984, and took her oath on February 28, 1984.

In 1987, the Bureau moved to its new site in Alabang, Muntinlupa, and acquired new facilities including state-of-the-art analytical instruments and a modern experimental animal laboratory with the $12 Million grant from the Government of Japan through the Japan International Cooperation Agency (JICA). This new BFAD in Alabang became operational on April 30, 1987.

In 1987, Republic Act No. 3720 was amended by Executive Order 175 to the new title "Foods, Drugs, and Devices and Cosmetics Act".

It was also on the same occasion of the inauguration of this new BFAD facility that Pres. Corazon C. Aquino declared publicly the Philippine National Drug Policy together with its four pillars, i.e., Quality Assurance, Rational Use of Drugs, Self-Reliance, and Tailored Procurement. Based on the issuance of E.O. Nos. 174 and 175 amendments to R.A. 5921 "The Pharmacy Law" and R.A. 3720 "Food, Drug, and Cosmetic Act" respectively, the Philippine National Drug Policy was organized. Executive Order No. 851 was superseded by E.O. No. 119 s. 1987 under administration of late Health Secretary Alfredo R. A. Bengzon, reorganized the BFAD was again reorganized as per Administrative Order (A.O.) No. 30 s. 1987, Provisions to Implement the Reorganization of the Department of Health.

Executive Order No. 102 dated May 24, 1999, was signed and redirected the functions and operations of the Department of Health, with then Hon. Alberto G. Romualdez, Sec. of Health, wherein BFAD was expanded with an added Division, the Policy, Planning, and Advocacy Division. The joining of the National Drug Policy workforce with that of BFAD in Alabang, further strengthened the Bureau to meet new challenges in serving the interests of the Filipino people consistent with the Philippine National Drug Policy and the National Health Policy.

Republic Act No. 9711 [known as the "Food and Drug Administration (FDA) Act of 2009"], an act strengthening and rationalizing the regulatory capacity of the Bureau of Food and Drugs by establishing adequate testing laboratories and field offices, upgrading its equipment, augmenting its human resources complement, giving authority to retain its income, renaming it the Food and Drug Administration (FDA), amending certain sections of Republic Act No. 3720, was signed by President on August 18, 2009.

As per Republic Act No. 12305, all of the regulatory functions regarding the use of devices generating ionizing radiation of the Radiation Regulation Division of the FDA-CDRRHR are transferred to the PhilATOM including all powers, functions, duties, records, files, equipment, assets, and funds.

And, as per Republic Act No. 12308, regulatory functions on local dairy milk products and veterinary drug products are transferred to the National Dairy Authority and Bureau of Animal Industry, respectively, both under the Department of Agriculture.
