= Bruce McTavish =

New Zealand boxing referee (1940–2025)

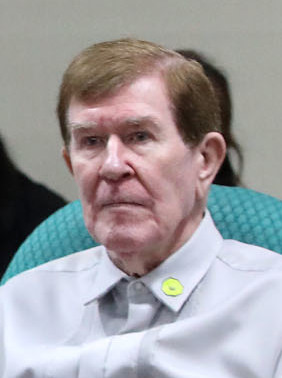
- McTavish in 2018

Personal information
- Citizenship: New Zealand / Philippines
- Born: Bruce Donald McTavish; October 11, 1940 Auckland, New Zealand
- Died: July 16, 2025 (aged 84) Angeles City, Philippines
- Education: University of Auckland
- Occupation: Referee
- Years active: 1970s–2019

Bruce Donald McTavish (October 11, 1940 – July 16, 2025) was a New Zealand–born Filipino boxing referee and philanthropist residing in the Philippines. He was named World Boxing Council Referee of the Year in 2013, 2015, and 2017.

A resident in the Philippines since the late 1960s, McTavish was born in Auckland, New Zealand, and was granted Filipino citizenship through naturalization in 2018 due to his work as a referee and philanthropist.

== Early life and education ==
McTavish was born on October 11, 1940, in Auckland, New Zealand. He was of Scottish descent.

After his amateur boxing career, McTavish studied at the University of Auckland where he attained an economics degree.

== Boxing career ==
=== Amateur boxing ===
McTavish was an amateur boxer. He retired with a record of 31 wins and 2 losses. He boxed as early as 9 years old until his early 20s.

=== Refereeing ===
Once settled in the Philippines, McTavish began his career in refereeing in the 1970s. He officiated matches outside the Philippines and New Zealand such as in Australia, China, England, Japan, North Korea, Mexico, Russia (particularly in Siberia), Thailand and the United Arab Emirates. He officiated some of the matches of Manny Pacquiao. Another notable match he officiated was the match between Siriporn Thaweesuk and Ayaka Miyano in Klong Prem Central Prison, Bangkok, Thailand. Thaweesuk was the winner of the match which was also the first women's world title match. He was the vice-chairman of the World Boxing Council of Referees.

McTavish won accolades for the Philippines in relation to his work as referee. He was named World Boxing Council Referee of the Year in 2013, 2015, and 2017. McTavish is the only Philippine representative to have received the accolade.

The last match he reportedly officiated was the bout between Wanheng Menayothin and Tatsuya Fukuhara in 2019.

== Philanthropy ==
McTavish was a member of the Rotary Club in the Philippines. From 1983 to 1984, McTavish served as president of the Rotary Club of Mabalacat. During his term he introduced the Polio Plus Project, the pilot program which became the basis of Rotary International efforts to eradicate polio worldwide. The club approached then First Lady Imelda Marcos which led to the formation of one of the first partnerships between a private entity and a government agency.

He was the first non-Filipino president of the Rotary Club of Mabalacat and the Rotary Club of Clark Centennial. In 2014, McTavish was involved with the Bahay Bata Foundation, a residence center for street children in Angeles, Pampanga, as the chairman of the center's board of trustees. Bahay Bata is a project of Rotary Club of Clark Centennial.

== Others ==
McTavish was the first non-Filipino director of the Metro Angeles Chamber of Commerce, the first non-Filipino president of the Hotel and Restaurant Association of Pampanga, and the St. James Cursillo. At the time he assumed the posts, McTavish had yet to be granted Filipino citizenship.

== Personal life ==
McTavish settled in the Philippines and became a resident on February 12, 1967. His first job in the country was in Clark, Pampanga area as a field office manager in an American automobile manufacturer before pursuing a career as a boxing referee. He was married to Carmen Tayag with whom he had two daughters who are master's degree holders.

=== Naturalization ===
McTavish acquired his Filipino citizenship through naturalization in 2018. There were three attempts in the legislature to grant Filipino citizenship to McTavish with the first effort done in 2010. Congressman Carmelo Lazatin filed House Bill No. 1445 in 2010 which endorsed McTavish's application for citizenship by naturalization through legislation. The bill was never passed. The second attempt was in 2014, when Congressman Yeng Guiao filed House Bill No. 2343 which re-endorsed McTavish's re-application. His philanthropy and his reputation as an international boxing referee cited as reasons for his naturalization.

The third attempt was a successful one after the Senate granted McTavish citizenship through House Bill No. 7388 authored by Congressman Carmelo Lazatin Jr. which was sponsored by Senator Richard Gordon as chair of Senate committee on Justice and Human Rights. The bill was passed on both chambers of the legislature and was signed into law by President Rodrigo Duterte on December 14, 2018.

=== Death ===
McTavish died at his residence in Angeles City, Pampanga, on July 16, 2025, at the age of 84.
