= Mary Ann Maslog =

Filipino criminal

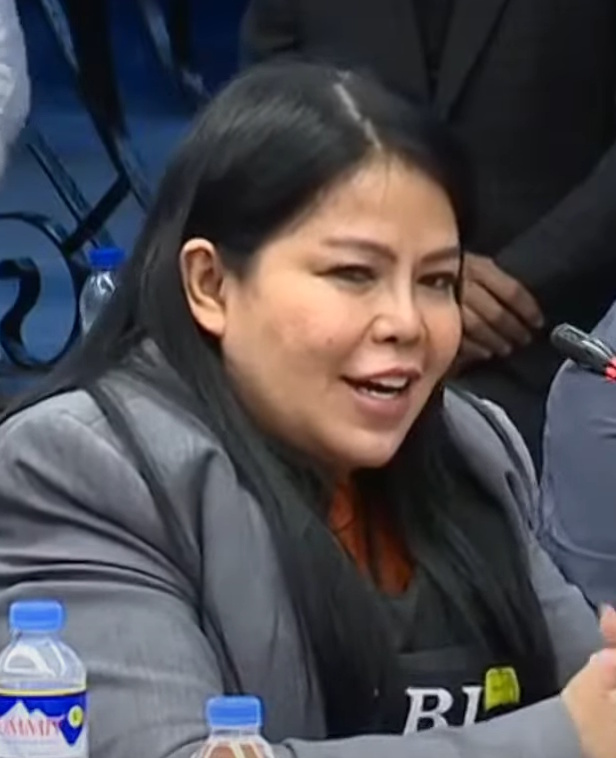
- Maslog in 2024
- Other name: Mary Ann Evans Smith; Mary Ann Tupa Maslog; Mary Ann Tupa Maslog–Smith; Jessica Sese Francisco
- Occupations: Medical representative, entrepreneur, confidence trickster
- Known for: 1998 DECS textbook scam
- Spouses: Rommel Maslog; Michael Lee Smith
- Status: In prison
- Conviction: Graft
- Penalty: 10 years of imprisonment

Details
- Date apprehended: 2024
- Imprisoned at: National Bureau of Investigation facility, Muntinlupa

Mary Ann Maslog is a Filipina businesswoman who was implicated in the 1998 textbook scam along with some Department of Education, Culture, and Sports (DECS) employees. In 2019 her lawyers informed the Sandiganbayan that she died, only to reappear in 2024 under the name "Dr. Jessica Sese Francisco."

== Early years ==
Mary Ann was a medical representative of Dispo Philippines in 1992 in Davao City. By December she was promoted to Assistant Sales Manager for the said company, and was assigned in Butuan, where she would meet her future husband Rommel Maslog. In 1997, she and Rommel started a company called Esteem Enterprises, which was focused on acquiring government contracts in the distribution of medicines and books.

== 1998 DECS textbook scam ==
Mary Ann Maslog conspired with two other Department of Education, Culture and Sports (DECS) officials in late 1998, Emilia V. Aranas who was Chief Accountant for Region VIII (Eastern Visayas), and Ernesto R. Guiang, Chief of Budget and Finance Division Region VIII. Investigators found that Aranas and Guiang processed and approved documents pertaining to PhP 24 million supply contract to Esteem Enterprise of Maslog. The Sub-Allotment Release Order (SARO) documents submitted were also found to be falsified for

On January 19, 1999, Maslog was caught delivering PhP 3 million at the Department of Budget & Management (DBM) in a box at the Malacañang Palace compound. The box was addressed to Secretary Benjamin Diokno, who was surprised and asked the National Bureau of Investigation (NBI) and the Philippine National Police to investigate Maslog thoroughly.

=== Senate hearings ===
During a Senate hearing under the Blue Ribbon and the Education, Arts and Culture Committees chaired by Senator Nene Pimentel, Maslog was brought in to testify, and was found to be initially evasive. The NBI disclosed that Maslog arrived in Malacanang at noon time and handed the box containing the money to Celeste Payot, who was the legislative liaison specialist of DBM. The NBI quoted Maslog saying that the PhP 3 million was intended for Deputy Executive Secretary Vicente dela Serna and Ricardo Fulgencio, a consultant of the Office of the President. It was also disclosed that Mary Ann was accompanied by her husband Rommel Maslog. The Senate hearing cleared dela Serna and Fulgencio, but recommended that charges be filed against Maslog.

Senator Raul Roco meanwhile disclosed that Maslog was part of the "Gang of Four" who were known lobbyists and influence peddlers at DECS. These were Maslog, Celia Ejercito de Castro, a cousin of then President Joseph Estrada, Nora Petines, and Laarni Enriquez, Estrada's mistress. The "Gang of Four" was trying to secure a PhP 200 million budget from DECS for the procurement of textbooks, and Maslog was merely a courier of the group. Maslog denied the accusation of knowing or being part of the "Gang of Four."

Sen. Roco also disclosed that it was Maslog, Petines, and De Castro who approached Caloocan mayor Boy Asistio to lobby with Enriquez to get the DECS PhP 400 million budget on various procurement. Executive Secretary Ronaldo Zamora and Malacanang Spokesperson Jerry Barican questioned the Senate Committee's accusation, and said that they should first make sure of the criminal actions of Laarni Enriquez before summoning her to the Senate.

Secretary Andrew Gonzalez of DECS disclosed to the Senate Committee that it was De Castro who was lobbying for the release of the PhP 200 million for the textbooks.

=== Sandiganbayan case ===
On November 20, 2008, the Sandiganbayan ordered the arrest of Maslog, Arenas, and Guiang.

In 2019, Maslog's lawyers submitted her alleged death certificates dated November 18, 2019 to the Sandiganbayan, moving to have the case Dismissed.

On October 16, 2020, in a 45-page decision, the Sandiganbayan found Aranas and Guiang guilty, sentencing them to 6 years and 1 month minimum or 10 years maximum imprisonment. On January 1, 2021, the Sandiganbayan released a decision that Aranas and Guiang will face imprisonment of 10 years, and permanently disqualified to hold public office. Maslog avoided conviction as the case against her was dismissed in view of the submission of her death certificates. On January 29, 2021, the Sandiganbayan rejected a Joint Motion for Reconsideration filed by Aranas and Guiang, upholding their conviction.

On March 3, 2022, the lawyers of Ernesto Guiang also submitted a motion to the Sandiganbayan for the dismissal of the case against their client as he had already died on June 21, 2021, in Tacloban.

Maslog in January 2025 was convicted of graft and sentenced to ten years of imprisonment. She remains detained at the National Bureau of Investigation facility in Muntinlupa.

== US immigration scam ==
Maslog escaped to the United States, remarried and took on the name Mary Ann Smith. Filipino journalist Ellen Tordesillas disclosed in June 2010 that Smith was caught in Seattle and was extradited to Memphis, Tennessee to face charges against her for wire fraud and mail fraud. U.S. Immigration and Customs Enforcement's (ICE) Homeland Security Investigations (HSI) and the Department of Homeland Security-Office of the Inspector General investigated on complaints that Smith operated a scheme targeting immigrants who wanted to bring in relatives into the United States using students visa under a company named International Business Network (IBN), with Michael Smith as the CEO, and Mary Ann Smith as the Vice President. IBN claimed that they are associated with the US Citizen and Immigration Service Agency (USCIS), which denied this claim. Smith would charge US$6500 per applicant. Thirty-four victims fell for the scam with a total financial loss of US$359,270. The scheme even gave victims falsified documents from the Secretary of State. Smith pleaded guilty, and was sentenced to 6 years imprisonment.

== Return to the Philippines as Jessica Francisco ==
Maslog returned to the Philippines at an undetermined date after residing in the United States. She took up the identity of "Dr. Jessica Francisco". She filed a complaint against president Bongbong Marcos' former executive secretary Vic Rodriguez with the National Bureau of Investigation (NBI) for alleged fraud. After the NBI failed to verify Maslog's provided information, she herself became the subject of investigation.

She was arrested on September 25, 2024, due to complaints filed by two individuals over fraud. Maslog allegedly introduced herself as Francisco and posed as a supplier of water systems and medical supplies in Bangsamoro. The NBI announced that Jessica Francisco's fingerprints matched with those of Mary Ann Maslog.

== Involvement with Alice Guo's arrest ==
On October 8, 2024, Maslog was brought into the Senate Committee on Women, Children, Family Relations and Gender Equality to face investigation on her involvement in the escape and return of former Mayor of Bamban, Tarlac, Alice Guo. Maslog initially introduced herself as Jessica Francisco, denying to be "Maslog". The NBI disputed this with their dactyloscopy analysis, proving Francisco and Maslog are one and the same. The Senate continued to address her as Maslog thereafter.

=== Liseldo Calugay connection ===
When asked by Sen. Jinggoy Estrada on whether Maslog knew Sual, Pangasinan Mayor Liseldo Calugay, she answered positively, and informed the committee she knew Calugay for 2 years, and she "knew of Alice Guo." When asked if she has any knowledge of Calugay and Guo's relationship, Maslog shared that she knew that they were a couple. Maslog approached Calugay in June 2024 to help her contact Guo, but Calugay claimed to beg off from this as he did not want to get involved. Maslog resorted to contacting Guo through her lawyers.

Reports also surfaced that Maslog was in the company of Calugay and former CIDG Chief Gen. Romeo Caramat early 2024, and video of the event was recorded by Maslog herself.

=== PNP Intelligence Group connection ===
Maslog claimed that the Philippine National Police–Intelligence Group (PNP–IG) approached her around May 2024 to help contact Guo as they knew she was connected to Mayor Calugay. PNP-IG Chief Gen. Romeo Macapaz denied her claim instead said that a certain "Dr. Jessica Francisco" approached them who claims have direct contact with Guo's lawyers. Senator Ronald dela Rosa taking note of Maslog's inconsistency moved to cite her in contempt.

Dela Rosa also suspected that Maslog is being used by the Marcos administration to pin him, Senator Bong Go, and former President Rodrigo Duterte over the POGO controversy. Dela Rosa claimed she went to Indonesia to get Guo to sign an affidavit claiming the same. President Bongbong Marcos denied Dela Rosa's claims.

When asked, Stephen David, Guo's lawyer as to why he entertained Maslog. He said they trusted her because she was with top PNP generals.

=== Visiting Indonesia ===
Maslog also admitted that she went to Indonesia twice to meet with Alice Guo. The first time it was when Shiela Guo and Casandra Ong was caught by the Indonesian National Police, and the second time after they caught Alice Guo. Initially she said that her flight was going to be reimbursed by the PNP-IG. Gen. Macapaz denied this, and said that Maslog joined them during their first trip to Jakarta, and she paid for her own ticket. On the second instance, Gen. Macapaz accompanied Secretary of the Interior and Local Government Benhur Abalos and PNP Chief Rommel Marbil. Maslog flew to Jakarta on her own, and they met her at the INP Headquarters. The Senate also found out that Maslog was able to visit Guo at the PNP Detention Center in Camp Crame twice - in the first instance with Gen. Macapaz and Guo's lawyers, and during the second one Macapaz was no longer present. Macapaz shared that she only joined them as to give thanks for their help in getting Guo back to the Philippines.

Senator Risa Hontiveros on the other hand disclosed that her staff found a record of "Dr. Jessica Francisco" who approached her office a few weeks back wanting to hold a meeting, claiming that she was a "consultant" of the Indonesian Embassy at Manila. Her staff found Maslog's claims spurious, as they never heard of anyone being a consultant of the Indonesian Embassy.

== Personal life ==
Mary Ann was married to Rommel Maslog but later separated. Rommel later became the mayor of Talisayan, Misamis Oriental. Bilyonaryo reports that Maslog's current partner is a certain Wouter De Jong, and had former CIDG Chief Gen. Romeo Caramat as one of her principal sponsor at the wedding.
