= Philippine Atomic Energy Regulatory Authority =

Regulatory agency overview
- Formed: September 18, 2025
- Type: Independent quasi-judicial body
- Jurisdiction: Government of the Philippines
- Regulatory agency executive: Vacant, Director General
- Key document: Republic Act No. 12305

The Philippine Atomic Energy Regulatory Authority (PhilATOM) is the regulatory body for nuclear energy and radioactive materials in the Philippines.

== History ==
The Philippine Atomic Energy Regulatory Authority (PhilATOM) was formed when Republic Act No. 12305, or the Philippine National Nuclear Energy Safety Act, was signed into law on September 18, 2025 by President Bongbong Marcos. It absorbed the regulatory functions of the Philippine Nuclear Research Institute.

The law is seen as a sign that the government is serious in setting up an operational nuclear power plant.

== Mandate ==
The PhilATOM is an independent quasi-judicial body which is the sole regulating body of nuclear energy and radiation sources in the Philippines. It is also tasked to prevent and penalize the usage of nuclear technology for military or harmful applications.

It is expected to grant license in relation to the construction and operation of nuclear power stations in the country. It will also regulate devices for nuclear medicine.

It is also the national counterpart of the International Atomic Energy Agency (IAEA)
