= 2024 in the Philippines =

- Decades: 2000s; 2010s; 2020s
- See also: List of years in the Philippines; films; music; television; sports

2024 in the Philippines details notable events that occurred in the Philippines in 2024.

== Incumbents ==
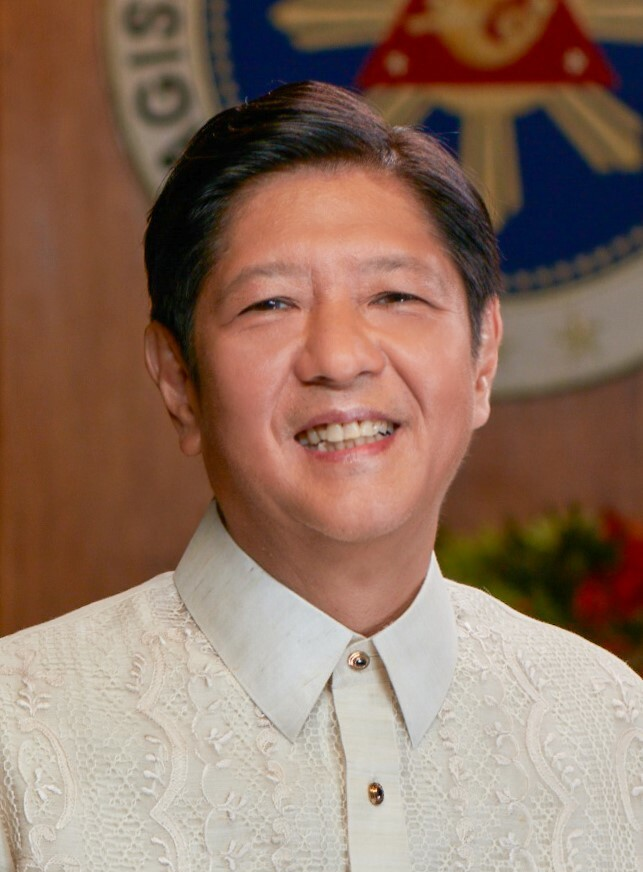
Ferdinand R. Marcos Jr.

Sara Z. Duterte

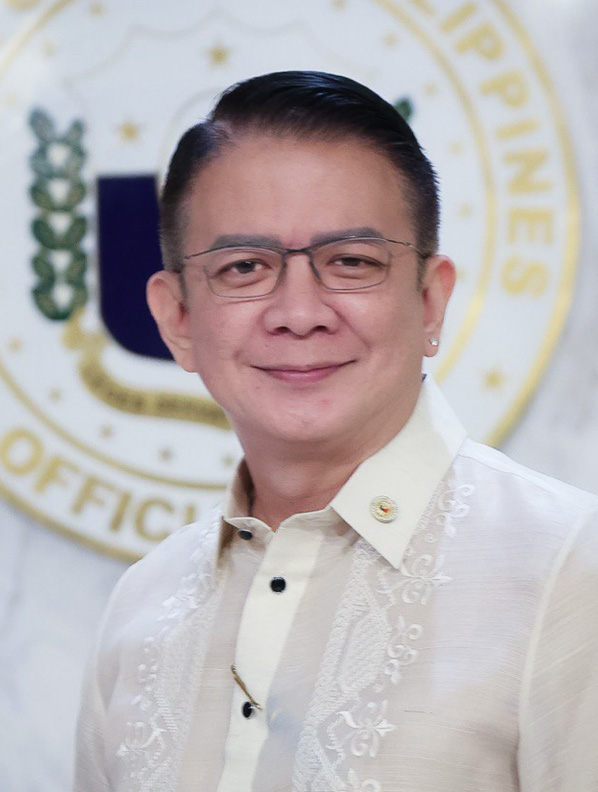
Francis G. Escudero

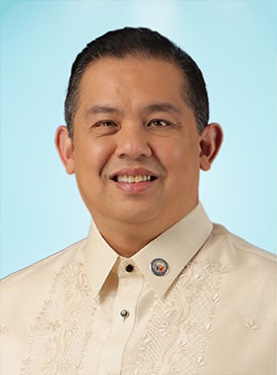
Ferdinand Martin G. Romualdez Sr.

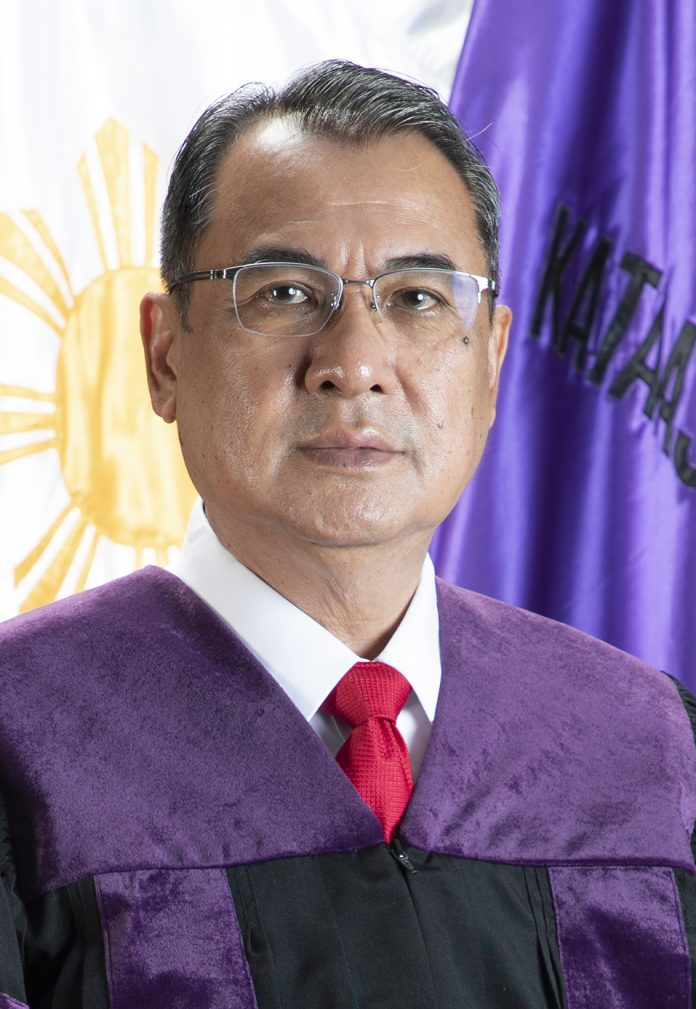
Alexander G. Gesmundo

- President: Bongbong Marcos (PFP)
- Vice President: Sara Duterte (HNP)
- Congress (19th):
  - Senate President:
    - Migz Zubiri (Independent) (until May 20)
    - Francis Escudero (NPC) (from May 20)
  - House Speaker: Martin Romualdez (Lakas-CMD)
- Chief Justice: Alexander Gesmundo

== Ongoing events ==
- 2023–2024 transport strikes in the Philippines
- 2024 constitutional reform attempts in the Philippines
- 2024 Philippine census
- Congressional inquiries on Alice Guo and Philippine Offshore Gaming Operators (from May 2024)
- 2023–2024 mpox epidemic in the Philippines (from August 2024; see Mpox in the Philippines)
- House of Representatives Quad Committee inquiries on the Philippine drug war (from August 2024)

== Events ==
=== January ===
- January 1 – Transition period for the Public Utility Vehicle Modernization Program begins. Non-consolidated PUVs, whose operation has been extended for a month, will be prohibited from operating in the country after January 31. However, on January 24, President Marcos extends the deadline for consolidation until April 30.
- January 2–5 – A massive power outage occurs in the entire Western Visayas following the tripping of multiple power plants in Panay.
- January 4 – PIRMA, the group behind a charter change campaign in 1997, renews its attempts at constitutional reform through the People's Initiative.
- January 5 – President Marcos signs into law Republic Act No. 11976, allowing digitalization for simplified tax compliance.
- January 10 – The Sandiganbayan dismisses the ill-gotten wealth case against ten members of the Nieto group, alleged associates of former president Ferdinand Marcos and First Lady Imelda Marcos involving the Eastern Telecommunications Philippines shares, citing lack of evidence.
- January 15–20 – Heavy rains brought by a shear line affect Caraga, Davao Region, Northern Mindanao and parts of the Visayas; causing declarations of a state of calamity in Davao del Norte, Davao de Oro, Davao Oriental, and parts of Agusan del Sur.
- January 15 – Full implementation of the Anti-Terrorism Act (RA No. 11479), whose procedural rules had been approved by the Supreme Court through an en banc resolution on December 5, 2023, begins.
- January 17 – The Ombudsman orders the dismissal of Jo Mark Libre as a commissioner in the Commission on Higher Education due to nepotism and grave misconduct.
- January 18 – The Supreme Court releases its October 2022 decision, dismissing the petition of property developer Ortigas & Company Limited Partnership for the recovery of the 18.4-hectare (45-acre) land allegedly forcibly donated to then president Ferdinand Marcos and later sequestered by the Presidential Commission on Good Government (PCGG), thus affirming the 2020 Sandiganbayan ruling.
- January 19 – The Sandiganbayan acquits Senator Jinggoy Estrada and Janet Lim-Napoles of plunder in relation to the pork barrel scam. However, the court convicts Estrada of bribery with a prison sentence of 10–12 years in total, and Napoles of corruption of public officials. On August 22, Estrada's bribery conviction is overturned by the Sandiganbayan following an appeal.
- January 22 – The Sandiganbayan acquits former Makati mayor Elenita Binay of graft and malversation charges filed over the anomalous purchase of ₱9.9 million in medical equipment for the Ospital ng Makati in 2001.
- January 23:
  - The National Telecommunications Commission orders the indefinite suspension of the broadcast operations of Sonshine Media Network International citing the network's failure to comply with an earlier suspension order.
  - The Senate committee on women conducts a public hearing regarding the alleged abuses within the Kingdom of Jesus Christ. Three women, two Ukrainian nationals and one Filipino, accuse church leader Apollo Quiboloy of sexually abusing them.
- January 24 – The province of Nueva Vizcaya is declared "insurgency-cleared" by the government.
- January 25 – Nine suspected Dawlah Islamiyah–Maute group members, including their leader who was the alleged mastermind in the Mindanao State University bombing, are killed in an encounter between the Philippine Army and around 15 militants in Piagapo, Lanao del Sur.
- January 26:
  - The Antipolo Cathedral is officially declared as the first international shrine in Southeast Asia.
  - The Department of the Interior and Local Government dismisses Rosendo Labadlabad as mayor of Sindangan, Zamboanga del Norte following an order from the Ombudsman to remove him for the illegal issuance of cockfighting permits.
- January 28–February 3 – Floods and landslide caused by torrential rain, brought by the northeast monsoon and the trough of a low pressure area, hit Mindanao, with damages reaching ₱3.62 billion; Davao and Caraga regions are the worst-hit; Agusan del Sur, Butuan, and the municipalities of Las Nieves in Agusan del Norte, Lingig in Surigao del Sur and Maco in Davao de Oro, are placed under a state of calamity.
- January 28 – President Marcos formally launches Bagong Pilipinas, the official campaign of his administration, at the Quirino Grandstand in Manila.
- January 29:
  - The Commission on Elections (COMELEC) halts the implementation of Resolution No. 10650, which serves as the Implementing Rules and Regulations of the Initiative and Referendum Act (RA No. 6735). This action thereby suspends all proceedings regarding the People's Initiative to amend the Constitution of the Philippines.
  - The Catholic Bishops' Conference of the Philippines officially designates the Minor Basilica of the Black Nazarene in Quiapo, Manila, as a national shrine.

=== February ===
- February 6 – A landslide near a gold mine in Maco, Davao de Oro, kills 98 people and injures 32; eight others remain missing.
- February 15 – Myrna Mabanza, an alleged financier of Al-Qaeda and a supporter of Islamic State is arrested in Indanan, Sulu.
- February 16 – The Supreme Court convicts former Philippine National Police-Special Action Force (PNP-SAF) director Leocadio Santiago Jr. of serious dishonesty over the anomalous purchase of used helicopters in 2008.
- February 20 – The Philippines becomes the first Asian country to ratify the Violence and Harassment Convention (C190) of the International Labour Organization.
- February 21 – Murder of Jullebee Ranara: A Kuwaiti court upholds the conviction of Ranara's killer.
- February 22 – COMELEC awards a ₱17.9 billion-contract to a joint venture led by South Korean firm Miru Systems to provide voting machines and other logistics for the 2025 general election, officially ending Smartmatic's role as the country's provider of voting machines since the automation of elections in 2010. The agreement is finalized on March 11.
- February 23 – The Sandiganbayan convicts Maria Cristina Vizcarra, an officer of the non-governmental organization (NGO) GabayMasa Development Foundation, Incorporated, of graft for her role in a case of the pork barrel scam involving deceased Eastern Samar representative Teodulo Coquilla.
- February 26–June 7 – A state of calamity is declared in the Bangsamoro Autonomous Region in Muslim Mindanao, Zamboanga City, Occidental Mindoro, Antique, Sultan Kudarat, South Cotabato, Negros Oriental, Iloilo, Cebu Province, Bohol and parts of Cebu City, Cotabato, Guimaras, Ifugao, Ilocos Norte, Negros Occidental, Oriental Mindoro, Palawan, Romblon, Sarangani, and Zamboanga del Norte due to agricultural damage caused by the El Niño phenomenon. By May 21, the amount of agricultural damage from El Niño nationwide surpasses ₱9.5 billion.
- February 26:
  - President Marcos signs into law Republic Act No. 11981, also known as the Tatak Pinoy Law, seeking to promote domestic production of sophisticated goods by creating the Tatak Pinoy Council.
  - The Sandiganbayan releases a February 23 decision dismissing the ill-gotten wealth case against former Philippine Jai Alai and Amusement Corporation director Olympio Bermudez, deceased former energy minister Geronimo Velasco, and deceased Manila Bulletin chair Emilio Yap, alleged associates of Ferdinand and Imelda Marcos, involving the properties of the Bataan Shipyard and Engineering Company, Inc. and two other firms, citing lack of evidence.
- February 27 – The Office of the President orders the dismissal of Assistant Solicitor General Derek Puertollano for sexually harassing two legal interns.
- February 29 – The Sandiganbayan releases a February 28 decision dismissing with finality a forfeiture case filed by the Presidential Commission on Good Government against three firms involved in the Coco Levy Fund scam, citing inordinate delays on the part of the plaintiff.

=== March ===
- March 4 – The Department of Agriculture announces the suspension of 139 officials and employees of the National Food Authority (NFA), including its administrator Roderico Bioco, for their alleged involvement in the controversial sale of rice buffer stocks. On March 11, the Ombudsman also suspends the NFA's acting administrator Piolito Santos, over the same case.
- March 5:
  - The Supreme Court strikes down the ticketing and licensing regulations for traffic violations of 14 cities and the municipality of Pateros in Metro Manila and orders them to comply with the single ticketing system imposed by the Metropolitan Manila Development Authority.
  - The Supreme Court rules in favor of allowing the Department of Energy to take over the operations of private firms in the oil industry in times of emergency.
  - The Philippine Coast Guard vessel BRP Sindangan figures in a collision with a China Coast Guard vessel during a resupply mission to the BRP Sierra Madre in Second Thomas Shoal in the South China Sea. Four people are injured after two China Coast Guard vessels fire water cannons on another boat participating in the resupply.
- March 6 – The Supreme Court releases an April 25, 2023 decision dismissing the petition of various groups which questioned the authority of the Philippine Amusement and Gaming Corporation over Philippine Offshore Gaming Operations (POGOs).
- March 7 – The Supreme Court releases a July 11, 2023 decision dismissing a petition challenging the Public Utility Vehicle Modernization Program, which is being opposed by several transport groups.
- March 11 – President Marcos signs into law Republic Act No. 11984 or the No Permit, No Exam Prohibition Act, allowing students with unpaid school fees to take examinations, and Republic Act No. 11983 or the New Philippine Passport Act, which allows for online Philippine passport applications.
- March 12 – The Supreme Court releases a June 13, 2023 decision dismissing a petition to require the COMELEC to issue guidelines on automated election systems.
- March 13 – A raid by security forces on a POGO suspected of criminal activities in Bamban, Tarlac leads to the rescue of 871 individuals inside, including 371 Filipinos and 432 Chinese nationals, and an investigation into the origins and possible involvement of the town's mayor, Alice Guo from May 2024.
- March 15 – The Sandiganbayan releases a March 13 decision ordering Myrna Bayucan, the treasurer of the NGO Focus on Development of Goals Foundation, Inc. (Focus), to repay ₱4.6 million to the government in a case of the PDAF scam involving Senator Lito Lapid.
- March 17 – Four soldiers are killed in an ambush by Dawlah Islamiyah militants in Datu Hoffer Ampatuan, Maguindanao del Sur. Later that day, a bomb is detonated at a PNP compound in Shariff Saydona Mustapha, but does not cause casualties.
- March 20 – The Supreme Court issues a ruling banning legal officers of local government units from representing their respective officials in cases involving the Ombudsman, citing conflict of interest.
- March 21:
  - San Miguel Corporation begins construction of the 76.8-kilometer Pangasinan Link Expressway (PLEX) project.
  - Arnolfo Teves Jr. is arrested in Dili, East Timor, where he had sought asylum after being accused of involvement in the assassination of Roel Degamo.
  - A measles outbreak is declared in Bangsamoro by the regional Ministry of Health with 592 cases and three deaths recorded since January 2024.
- March 22 – Abu Halil, a leader of the Bangsamoro Islamic Freedom Fighters-Karialan faction, is killed in an encounter with soldiers in Datu Saudi Ampatuan, Maguindanao del Sur.
- March 23 – The civilian vessel Unaizah May 4 is heavily damaged after being attacked with water cannons by the China Coast Guard on its way to deliver supplies to the Philippine garrison in Second Thomas Shoal, injuring three Philippine Navy personnel on board. In a separate incident, a team of Filipino scientists are hovered over by a Chinese Navy helicopter while conducting research in Sand Cay, injuring some of its members.
- March 25 – The Court of Tax Appeals releases a March 21 decision dismissing a ₱44.7-million tax evasion case against Janet Lim-Napoles, citing insufficient evidence.
- March 26–April 5 – A state of calamity is declared in Iloilo City, Cavite and Santa Rosa, Laguna due to outbreaks of whooping cough.
- March 26 – Three NPA rebels, including a commander, are killed in an encounter with soldiers in Rosario, Batangas.
- March 28 – The Philippine National Railways halts operations in Metro Manila until 2029 to make way for the construction of the North-South Commuter Railway.

=== April ===
- April 2:
  - The Court of Appeals releases a March 21 decision overturning the Ombudsman's dismissal in August 2023 of Manila International Airport Authority general manager Cesar Chiong and his deputy Irene Montalbo for misconduct, citing lack of evidence.
  - A state of calamity is declared in Boac and Buenavista, Marinduque due to outbreaks of rabies that leave two people dead and 42 dogs and other livestock and wildlife infected.
- April 3:
  - The Supreme Court rules that persons convicted of heinous crimes are eligible for a reduction in their sentences under the New Good Conduct Time Allowance Law.
  - The Supreme Court strikes down then-President Rodrigo Duterte's 2018 revocation of the amnesty issued for then-Senator Antonio Trillanes IV for rebellion as unconstitutional, saying that a President cannot revoke an amnesty without congressional approval.
- April 5:
  - President Marcos signs into law Republic Act No. 11993, dividing Caloocan's Barangay Bagong Silang, the country's largest barangay in terms of area and population, into six barangays. The division is approved by a majority of voters in a plebiscite on August 31.
  - United Methodist Church deaconess Norma Dollaga receives the World Methodist Peace Award for her role in defending victims of the Philippine drug war as co-founder of the human rights group Rise Up for Life and Rights.
- April 8:
  - COMELEC awards a ₱1.4 billion contract to provide secure electronic transmission services (SETS) to a joint venture of iOne Resources Incorporated and Ardent Networks for the 2025 elections, officially displacing Smartmatic in that role for the first time since 2010.
  - Romulo Micabalo, the deputy leader of the NPA Eastern Visayas Regional Party Committee, is arrested by government forces in Consolacion, Cebu.
- April 11:
  - A Robinson R22 training helicopter of the Philippine Navy crashes near a market in Cavite City, killing the two pilots on board.
  - The Office of the President imposes a 60-day preventive suspension on Davao del Norte Governor Edwin Jubahib after complaints are filed against him for alleged "misuse of authority, potential oppression, and the utilization of government funds to advance the interests of a private company". The order leads to a standoff at the Provincial Capitol in Tagum as Jubahib's supporters occupy the premises to prevent the order from being implemented, while Jubahib calls the allegations politically motivated and defies the suspension.
  - Japan–Philippines relations, Philippines–United States relations: President Marcos meets with Japanese Prime Minister Fumio Kishida and U.S. President Joe Biden in Washington, D.C. for the first trilateral summit between their countries.
- April 12:
  - Former president Duterte acknowledges the existence of a "gentleman's agreement" that he made in office with Chinese President Xi Jinping on maintaining a "status quo" in the South China Sea that disallowed repairs to the BRP Sierra Madre grounded in Second Thomas Shoal, but denies making any concession to China. On May 4, China releases what it calls a text of the agreement, saying that it limited access to the vicinity of disputed islands in the South China Sea to small fishing vessels.
  - The municipalities of Divilacan and Maconacon, Isabela are declared "insurgency-free" by the government.
- April 13:
  - A majority of voters move to ratify the creation of eight municipalities (Kadayangan, Kapalawan, Ligawasan, Malidegao, Nabalawag, Old Kaabakan, Pahamuddin and Tugunan) in the Special Geographic Area of the Bangsamoro through a plebiscite, after the Bangsamoro Transition Authority approved eight laws organizing the barangays into new municipalities on August 16, 2023.
  - Three suspected Dawlah Islamiyah militants are killed in an encounter with government forces in Munai, Lanao del Norte.
- April 15–16 – PISTON and Manibela hold a nationwide transportation strike in protest over the Public Utility Vehicle Modernization Program and as part of their demand for an extension of the April 30 deadline for the consolidation of PUV units pending an ongoing appeal in the Supreme Court.
- April 15 – Philippine drug war: Around 1.4 tons of shabu valued at around ₱9.68 billion are intercepted by police at a checkpoint in Alitagtag, Batangas, in the second biggest drug haul in the country's history. One suspect is arrested.
- April 17:
  - The Supreme Court overturns the disqualification of Smartmatic by COMELEC, saying that the latter committed grave abuse of discretion for disqualifying Smartmatic before it could participate in the bidding process for the 2025 elections, but stops short of nullifying COMELEC's existing agreements with alternative suppliers of logistics.
  - The Ombudsman orders the dismissal of Demosthenes Escoto as director of the Bureau of Fisheries and Aquatic Resources following his 2018 conviction for grave misconduct over the procurement of communications equipment for the agency.
  - The Sandiganbayan acquits Janet Lim-Napoles of graft in a case of the PDAF scam involving then-Nueva Ecija representative Aurelio Umali, citing lack of evidence.
- April 19 – Sultan Kudarat governor Pax Ali Mangudadatu imposes a 15-month suspension on Isulan mayor Marites Pallasigue, citing administrative abuses.
- April 20 – The Caloocan Regional Trial Court drops charges against the PISTON 6 who were arrested in 2020 after protesting against the prohibition against jeepneys plying their routes during the COVID-19 pandemic.
- April 22:
  - Mohiden Animbang, alias Kagui Karialan, the top commander of the Bangsamoro Islamic Freedom Fighters-Karialan faction, is killed along with 11 militants during an encounter with government forces in Datu Saudi Ampatuan, Maguindanao del Sur.
  - The Ombudsman orders the dismissal of Christian Noveras and his father Gerardo Noveras as governor and vice governor of Aurora respectively for administrative abuses.
  - A state of calamity is declared in Iloilo City due to water shortages caused by El Niño.
  - The Supreme Court overturns COMELEC's dismissal of a disqualification case filed against Cagayan governor Manuel Mamba, citing grave abuse of discretion by the former.
  - The 17th-century Saint Ferdinand Co-Cathedral in Ilagan, Isabela is gutted by a fire that leaves one person injured.
- April 23:
  - The Court of Appeals orders the University of the Philippines Los Baños and the Philippine Rice Research Institute to halt the release of genetically modified crops such as eggplant and rice, following a petition from Greenpeace and several other environmentalist groups over its ecological effects.
  - The Court of Appeals affirms the dismissal from service of three Bureau of Immigration (BI) officers over their involvement in the ‘pastillas’ scam, which allowed the illegal entry of Chinese citizens into the country.
- April 24:
  - The Supreme Court rules that immunity from prosecution possessed by members of international organisations in the Philippines is only limited to acts conducted in official capacity following a lawsuit against the Asian Development Bank.
  - The COMELEC First Division, acting on a different complaint to the one revived by the Supreme Court on April 22, moves to disqualify Cagayan governor Manuel Mamba for violations on public spending during his 2022 reelection campaign.
  - Nawapi Abdulsaid, an Abu Sayyaf militant involved in several beheadings and bombings, is killed in a shootout with soldiers in Hadji Mohammad Ajul, Basilan.
- April 25 – The Ombudsman orders the six-month suspension of Silang, Cavite mayor Alston Kevin Anarna, citing the anomalous procurement of logistics for the town's patronal feast in 2023.
- April 26 – The Supreme Court upholds the invalidation of search warrants that led to the arrest of Reina Mae Nasino, who lost her infant daughter while in detention, and two other activists in 2020.
- April 29–May 1 – PISTON holds a nationwide transport strike in protest against the Public Utility Vehicle Modernization Program.
- April 30:
  - Deadline of the extended PUV consolidation period. After this date, unconsolidated jeepney franchises are revoked.
  - The Philippine Coast Guard vessel BRP Bagacay is damaged in a water cannon attack by three China Coast Guard ships during a deployment to Scarborough Shoal.

=== May ===
- May 1 – The Supreme Court releases a February decision declaring that the dismissal of an employee for testing positive for HIV is discriminatory, following a lawsuit filed by an overseas Filipino worker against a recruitment agency.
- May 2:
  - Manibela holds a nationwide transport strike in protest against the Public Utility Vehicle Modernization Program.
  - A state of emergency is declared in Cagayan de Oro due to a looming water shortage caused by a decision of Cagayan de Oro Bulk Water Incorporated to cut off the city's water supply due to massive unpaid debts incurred by the city water district.
  - The Taguig Regional Trial Court Branch 153 convicts Cedric Lee, Deniece Cornejo and two other respondents guilty in the 2014 serious illegal detention case filed by actor-host Vhong Navarro.
- May 8:
  - The Ombudsman imposes a six-month preventive suspension on Cebu City mayor Mike Rama on charges of administrative abuse.
  - The Supreme Court issues a writ of amparo recognizing red-tagging as a violation of human rights and a threat to individuals following a petition from Bayan Muna and Makabayan Coalition vice president Siegfred Deduro.
- May 15 – A court in Taguig convicts Ominta Romato Maute aka Farhana Maute of financing terrorism in a case involving a 2016 kidnapping by the Maute Group in Lanao del Sur and sentences her to life imprisonment.
- May 17:
  - The Court of Tax Appeals acquits former Chief Justice Maria Lourdes Sereno of tax evasion, citing lack of evidence.
  - Gregor Johann Haas, an Australian national and suspected member of the Sinaloa Cartel, is arrested in Bogo, Cebu following a red notice issued against him by Interpol on behalf of Indonesia, where he is facing drugs charges.
- May 20:
  - Senator Juan Miguel Zubiri resigns as Senate president and is replaced by Francis Escudero.
  - The Supreme Court acquits former Agriculture Secretary Arthur C. Yap of graft and malversation charges in a case of the PDAF scam involving former Misamis Occidental Representative Marina Clarete.
- May 18 – A state of calamity is declared in Eastern Samar due to outbreaks of rabies that leave three people dead.
- May 21 – A state of calamity is declared in Butuan due to water shortages caused by El Niño.
- May 22:
  - Davao del Norte representative Pantaleon Alvarez is censured by the House of Representatives over "seditious" remarks calling on the Armed Forces of the Philippines (AFP) to withdraw support for President Marcos.
  - President Marcos signs into law Republic Act No. 11995 or the Philippine Ecosystem and Natural Capital Accounting System (PENCAS) Act, establishing “a comprehensive information system and accounting framework" covering the country's natural resources.
  - The Ombudsman imposes a six-month preventive suspension on Nueva Ecija Governor Aurelio Umali over the granting of clearances for sand and gravel mining without an environmental permit. However, the suspension is halted after Umali obtains a temporary restraining order (TRO) from the Court of Appeals.
  - President Marcos orders the dismissal of Mabel Acosta as chair of the Mindanao Development Authority due to loss of trust and confidence. However, she defies the order and continues to hold office.
- May 24:
  - The Sandiganbayan convicts former ARMM governor Nur Misuari of two counts of graft involving the anomalous procurement of around ₱77 million worth of educational materials in 2000 and 2001.
  - President Marcos signs into law Republic Act No. 11996 or the Eddie Garcia law, establishing greater workplace and labor protections in the film and television industry.
- May 27 – A state of calamity is declared in Lucena, Quezon as well as in the 1st and 2nd districts of Quezon due to damage caused by Typhoon Aghon.
- May 28:
  - The Ombudsman imposes a six-month preventive suspension on Bohol Governor Erico Aristotle Aumentado and 68 other officials in the province and Central Visayas, including the mayors of eight municipalities (Sagbayan, Batuan, Catigbian, Clarin, Bilar, Sierra Bullones, Valencia, and Carmen) as part of an investigation into illegal construction within the Chocolate Hills natural monument. However, the suspension is lifted by the Ombudsman on July 31.
  - Udon Hashim, an Abu Sayyaf sub-commander said to be involved in a 2013 ambush in Talipao, Sulu that left 23 civilians dead, is killed in a police operation in Tandubas, Tawi-tawi.

=== June ===
- June 3:
  - President Marcos signs into law Republic Act No. 11997 or the Kabalikat sa Pagtuturo Act, establishing fixed allowances for public school teachers to cover additional education-related expenses.
  - PHIVOLCS raises Alert Level 2 over Mount Kanlaon after an eruption which prompts the evacuation of residents in Canlaon and parts of Negros Occidental. A state of calamity is declared in Canlaon and La Castellana, Negros Occidental on June 4, followed by Negros Oriental on December 27.
- June 6 – The municipality of Lantawan, Basilan, is declared free from the Abu Sayyaf Group by the government.
- June 7 – The Office of the President imposes another 30-day preventive suspension on suspended Davao del Norte Governor Edwin Jubahib over his direct involvement and use of government resources in a rally against the Northern Davao Electric Cooperative (Nordeco).
- June 10–12 – Manibela holds a nationwide transport strike in protest against the Public Utility Vehicle Modernization Program.
- June 10 – The country's largest solar pump irrigation project is inaugurated in Quirino, Isabela, consisting of 1,056 solar panels and two submersible pumps that can irrigate 350 hectares (860 acres).
- June 13:
  - The Sandiganbayan releases a June 10 decision convicting former Mamburao, Occidental Mindoro mayor Voltaire Anthony Villarosa of failing to remit ₱4.81 million in contributions and loans by municipal employees to the Government Service Insurance System (GSIS) from 2015 to 2016 and sentences him to four years' imprisonment.
  - President Marcos signs into law Republic Acts No. 12000 recreating the Negros Island Region and 12001 or the Real Property Valuation and Assessment Reform Act.
  - The Supreme Court releases an August 7, 2023 decision ordering the Sandiganbayan to reopen a graft case involving the granting of two loans worth ₱660 million in 2009 by the Development Bank of the Philippines to a firm owned by businessman Roberto Ongpin. However, it upholds the dismissal of charges against Ongpin, DBP president Reynaldo David and a DBP board member on account of their deaths.
- June 14 – Republic Act No. 12006, or the Free College Entrance Examinations Act, which mandates free entrance examinations for privately run colleges under limited circumstances, lapses into law.
- June 15 – The Philippines files a claim at the United Nations Commission on the Limits of the Continental Shelf asserting jurisdiction over an extended continental shelf in the South China Sea off the coast of Palawan.
- June 17 – A Philippine Navy serviceman is injured after their vessel collides with a China Coast Guard ship during a resupply mission to the BRP Sierra Madre in the Second Thomas Shoal. The AFP also accuses Chinese forces of boarding the vessel, seizing firearms that were being delivered to the Sierra Madre and harassing and damaging other vessels participating in the resupply mission.
- June 18 –
  - The city of Lamitan, Basilan, is declared free from the Abu Sayyaf Group by the government.
  - President Marcos ratifies the High Seas Treaty.
- June 20 – The PNP arrests former Negros Oriental Governor Pryde Henry Teves in Dumaguete over alleged violations of the Terrorism Financing Prevention and Suppression Act of 2012. He is released later in the day after posting bail.
- June 21 – The Bureau of Animal Industry confirms the first cases of Q fever in the country following tests on several goats in Marinduque that were imported from the United States.
- June 24:
  - The Muntinlupa RTC Branch 206 grants a demurrer to evidence filed by the defense team of former senator Leila de Lima, effectively dismissing the last of the three charges of conspiracy to commit drug trading filed against her during the presidency of Rodrigo Duterte. Meanwhile, the Quezon City RTC Branch 76, granting a certiorari, also dismisses two disobedience cases against her in relation to a subpoena for a House of Representatives inquiry into the said allegations.
  - Pampanga Governor Dennis Pineda imposes a preventive suspension on San Simon mayor Abundio Punsalan Jr. as part of an investigation into alleged corruption and administrative abuses.
  - Kuwait ends a ban on issuing visas to overseas Filipino workers that it had imposed in May 2023 following the Murder of Jullebee Ranara.
- June 25 – The Sandiganbayan releases a June 14 decision dismissing a graft case against former Land Bank of the Philippines president Gilda Pico and another senior official over the ₱4.2 billion-sale of the bank's 46.5 million shares of stock in the Manila Electric Company (Meralco) in 2008, citing a previous decision by the Supreme Court that nullified the complaint.
- June 26 – Ten NPA rebels are killed in an encounter with soldiers in Pantabangan, Nueva Ecija.

=== July ===
- July 1 – The Bureau of Corrections announces the release of Gerardo dela Peña, regarded as the Philippines' oldest political prisoner, at the age of 85, after his sentence for murder in 2013 is commuted by the Office of the President.
- July 3 – The Sandiganbayan convicts 15 former officials of three government-owned and controlled corporations (GOCCs) and two NGO officials of graft in a case of the PDAF scam involving former Misamis Occidental Representative Marina Clarete.
- July 4 – Philippines–United States relations: The Section 123 Agreement between the United States and the Philippines comes into effect.
- July 8:
  - Japan–Philippines relations: The Philippines and Japan sign the Reciprocal Access Agreement, allowing the deployment of defense personnel between each other's countries for training and other operations. The agreement is ratified by the Senate on December 16.
  - Joginder Geong, an Indian national wanted in his home country for leading a militant Sikh separatist group, is arrested in Bacolod.
- July 9 – The Office of the President imposes a 90-day preventive suspension on National Commission of Senior Citizens chair Franklin Quijano on charges of gross neglect of duty and grave misconduct.
- July 10 – The Sandiganbayan releases a July 8 decision convicting former Cagayan de Oro representative Constantino Jaraula of graft over his involvement in the Fertilizer Fund scam in 2004 and sentences him to between six and ten years' imprisonment.
- July 11:
  - Eleven people are killed and five others injured in a collision between a bus and a pickup truck in Abulug, Cagayan.
  - President Marcos vetoes the proposed Philippine National Police Organizational Reforms Act, citing administrative and financial concerns.
- July 15:
  - The Tagum RTC convicts Alliance of Concerned Teachers partylist representative France Castro and former Bayan Muna partylist representative Satur Ocampo of child abuse over the transportation of 14 Lumad students in Talaingod, Davao del Norte in 2018 and sentences them to between four and six years' imprisonment.
  - The Ombudsman releases a June 11 ruling reversing its dismissal of Sindangan, Zamboanga del Norte mayor Rosendo Labadlabad for grave misconduct over the issuance of cockfighting permits in 2023 and orders his reinstatement, citing a lack of evidence.
  - The Sandiganbayan releases a July 12 ruling acquitting former Philippine Normal University president Ester Ogena of graft in relation to a 2011 case involving a P1.1-million ad placement contract with Foreign Policy magazine that was conducted without public bidding.
  - The Jalaur River Multipurpose Project II, covering 17 municipalities of Panay, is opened.
- July 16 – A state of calamity is declared in Maguindanao del Sur due to floods caused by the overflowing of the Rio Grande de Mindanao.
- July 17 – A state of calamity is declared in Cavite City due to a massive fire that displaces 900 families in two barangays.
- July 18 – A state of calamity is declared in Pikit, Cotabato due to floods.
- July 19:
  - Vice President Sara Duterte formally resigns from her positions in the Cabinet of Bongbong Marcos as Secretary of Education and as Vice Chair of the National Task Force to End Local Communist Armed Conflict. She is replaced as education secretary by Sonny Angara, who vacates his seat in the Senate on July 18.
  - The Court of Appeals reverses the acquittal of Police Lieutenant Colonel Rafael Dumlao III in the 2017 kidnapping and killing of Jee Ick-Joo and sentences him to life imprisonment for being the mastermind of the event.
  - A state of calamity is declared in Pinamalayan, Oriental Mindoro due to floods.
- July 20 – President Marcos signs into law Republic Acts No. 12009 or the New Government Procurement Act and 12010 or the Anti-Financial Account Scamming Act.
- July 21 – The Philippines announces an agreement with China on resupply missions to the BRP Sierra Madre following the June 17 altercation with the China Coast Guard.
- July 22 – President Marcos officially announces a ban on all POGOs during his SONA.
- July 24–29 – A state of calamity is declared in Metro Manila, Bataan, Batangas, Bulacan, Cavite, Ilocos Norte, Oriental Mindoro, Pampanga, Kabacan and Pikit in Cotabato, Cainta, Rizal, and San Andres, Romblon due to floods caused by the southwest monsoon (habagat) enhanced by Typhoon Carina (Gaemi). At least 39 people are killed nationwide due to the storm, while 17 people are injured and three others are reported missing.
- July 24 – The Sandiganbayan releases a July 19 decision allowing the PCGG to retain control over the shares of stocks and funds of two sequestered companies owned by the family of Imelda Marcos' brother Benjamin Romualdez, citing a failure by the said firms to take advantage of a 2014 Supreme Court ruling that allowed the assets to be released.
- July 25 – The oil tanker MT Terra Nova capsizes off the coast of Limay, Bataan, killing one person and spilling oil into Manila Bay.
- July 26 – A former top United States official states that the U.S. Department of Defense covertly admitted to conducting a mass misinformation campaign targeting the Philippines using social media bots and fake accounts to disparage the safety of Chinese COVID-19 vaccines during the height of the COVID-19 pandemic, following public denial of its involvement in June 2024.
- July 28 – The Philippine Coast Guard finds and seals diesel fuel cargo leaks from MTKR Jason Bradley off the coast of Mariveles, Bataan, the second vessel to sink in Manila Bay in one week, following MT Terra Nova's sinking.
- July 30 – US Secretary of State Antony Blinken announces the allocation of $500 million to fund the AFP.
- July 31:
  - A state of calamity is declared in the municipalities of Kawit, Noveleta, Rosario, Tanza, Naic, Maragondon, and Ternate and the city of Bacoor in Cavite due to the Manila Bay oil spill.
  - The MV Mirola 1, carrying two drums of heavy fuel oil and 3,000 liters of diesel, is found abandoned, tilted and leaking oil off the coast of Mariveles, Bataan, making it the third vessel to be involved in the 2024 Manila Bay oil spill.

=== August ===
- August 1 – President Marcos signs into law Republic Act No. 12016 converting the Mountain Province State Polytechnic College into a state university called the Mountain Province State University.
- August 6 – A state of calamity is declared in Bataan due to damage caused by the 2024 Manila Bay oil spill.
- August 8–28 – A state of calamity is declared in Capiz, Iloilo, Samar, Iloilo City and Ormoc due to outbreaks of dengue.
- August 8 – A federal grand jury in the United States indicts former COMELEC chair Andres Bautista on charges of taking bribes from three co-accused, including a co-founder of Smartmatic in connection with the 2016 election.
- August 9 – The Court of Appeals releases a July 23 decision overturning the Securities and Exchange Commission's order in 2018 to shut down the news outlet Rappler on foreign ownership grounds, citing "grave abuse of discretion" and other legal and constitutional violations by the former.
- August 12:
  - A state of calamity is declared in Batangas due to outbreaks of African swine fever.
  - The Office of the President imposes an 18-month suspension on Abra vice governor Joy Bernos for unilaterally ordering the lockdown of a hospital in Bangued during the COVID-19 pandemic in 2020, when she was governor.
- August 13 – The Ombudsman orders the dismissal of Alice Guo as mayor of Bamban, Tarlac for grave misconduct over her involvement in the operations of an illegal POGO hub in the municipality. It also orders the suspension of vice-mayor Leonardo Anunciacion and seven of eight members of the Sangguniang Bayan of Bamban for three months on related charges.
- August 14–16 – Manibela holds a nationwide transport strike in protest against the Public Utility Vehicle Modernization Program.
- August 15 – The Supreme Court rules in favor of declaring Argel Cabatbat as the duly elected congressional representative of the Magsasaka Partylist in the 2022 elections following an intra-party dispute with a faction led by partylist chair Soliman Villamin Jr.
- August 16:
  - A court in Baguio convicts three cadets of the Philippine Military Academy for the hazing death of Darwin Dormitorio in 2019 and sentences them to life imprisonment.
  - The Sandiganbayan acquits former PNP Director-General Jesus Verzosa of graft in a case involving the anomalous purchase of second-hand helicopters for the service in 2009.
  - A state of climate emergency is declared in Bauang, La Union.
- August 19 – The Philippine Coast Guard vessels BRP Bagacay and BRP Cape Engaño are damaged in collisions caused by "dangerous maneuvers" by the China Coast Guard near Sabina Shoal in the South China Sea.
- August 20:
  - The Department of Foreign Affairs announces Manila's approval of a US request for it to temporarily host an immigrant visa processing center for Afghan refugees seeking to resettle in the US.
  - The Supreme Court blocks scheduled plebiscites on the creation of the municipalities of Nuling, Datu Sinsuat Balabaran, and Sheik Abas Hamza in Maguindanao del Norte, saying that a provision of the enabling acts passed by the Bangsamoro government allowing only residents of affected barangays to vote is unconstitutional.
  - The Ombudsman imposes a six-month suspension on Energy Regulatory Commission chair Monalisa Dimalanta for failing to act on complaints and petitions filed by a consumer rights group. However, the suspension is lifted on October 22, with Dimalanta formally reassuming office on October 31.
- August 22 – The Ombudsman imposes a one-year suspension on Mandaue mayor Jonas Cortes for grave misconduct regarding the appointment of a city official who had not qualified for the position.
- August 24 – A standoff between the Philippine National Police and members of the Kingdom of Jesus Christ at the church's compound in Davao City ensues as the police attempt to serve Apollo Quiboloy his arrest warrant on charges of sexual abuse.
- August 25 – The Bureau of Fisheries and Aquatic Resources vessel BRP Datu Sanday is damaged in a collision and water cannon fire by the China Coast Guard on its way to Sabina Shoal in the South China Sea.
- August 27 – Carlwyn Baldo, the mayor of Daraga, Albay, is arrested for the 2018 murder of Ako Bicol partylist representative Rodel Batocabe.
- August 28 – President Marcos signs into law Republic Act No. 12019 establishing the Loss and Damage Fund Board Act dealing with damages caused by climate-related disasters.
- August 31 – The Philippine Coast Guard vessel BRP Teresa Magbanua is damaged after being rammed three times by a China Coast Guard vessel near Sabina Shoal in the South China Sea.

=== September ===
- September 1 – The Quezon City Regional Trial Court releases its August 20 decision dismissing criminal cases against Iloilo representative and former Health Secretary Janette Garin and her co-respondents in relation to the Dengvaxia controversy, citing insufficient evidence.
- September 2–4 – A state of calamity is declared in Camarines Sur, Naga and Allen, Northern Samar due to floods caused by Tropical Storm Enteng (Yagi). At least 20 people are killed nationwide due to the storm, while 26 others are reported missing. Agricultural damage is estimated at ₱2.2 billion, with parts of Central Luzon and of Bicol Region being the most affected.
- September 3:
  - The Philippines ratifies the Labour Inspection Convention, 1947, the Convention on Mutual Administrative Assistance in Tax Matters and an agreement to establish an office of the International Fund for Agricultural Development in the country.
  - Dismissed Bamban mayor Alice Guo is arrested by the Directorate General of Immigration in Tangerang, Indonesia, after fleeing to the country from the Philippines amidst an ongoing Senate inquiry. She is placed under the custody of Philippine authorities and repatriated on September 5, arriving in the country on September 6.
- September 4:
  - The Supreme Court releases its ruling dated November 13, 2023, declaring that the estate of former President Ferdinand Marcos presently administered by President Bongbong Marcos has no ownership rights over a 57.68-hectare (142.5-acre) property in Paoay, Ilocos Norte by declaring the 25-year lease contract between the former president and the Philippine Tourism Authority in 1978 as unconstitutional. This property, which includes the Malacañang of the North and the Paoay Sports Complex, is deemed part of their ill-gotten wealth.
  - The Sandiganbayan releases an August 30 ruling acquitting former Zamboanga del Sur governor Aurora Cerilles of graft in the purchase of medical equipment for the Zamboanga del Sur Provincial Hospital in 2007.
- September 5:
  - 2024 RW1, a newly discovered asteroid, enters Earth's atmosphere and disintegrates over Cagayan, producing a fireball.
  - The Ombudsman releases its August 29 resolution ordering the dismissal of Albay governor Noel Rosal and the one-year suspension of his wife, Legazpi mayor Carmen Geraldine, after they were found guilty of administrative charges involving the illegal reassignment of government personnel in 2022. Meanwhile, graft charges against the Rosals, and charges against the provincial engineer, are both dismissed.
- September 8:
  - Kingdom of Jesus Christ founder Apollo Quiboloy is arrested in the church's compound in Davao City.
  - A state of calamity is declared in Bohol due to an outbreak of dengue.
- September 9:
  - The Supreme Court rules that Sulu is not part of the Bangsamoro region, citing the decision of a majority of voters in the province not to join the autonomous region when it was created in a 2019 plebiscite.
  - President Marcos dismisses Norman Tansingco as commissioner of the Bureau of Immigration, citing the agency's failure to prevent the escape of Alice Guo.
- September 10 – Former Iloilo City mayor Jed Patrick Mabilog returns to the Philippines after going into self-imposed exile in 2017 due to accusations of involvement in drug trafficking by former president Duterte. He surrenders to the National Bureau of Investigation (NBI) to face graft charges.
- September 11 – Former Palawan governor Mario Joel Reyes surrenders to the NBI after going into hiding in 2020 over the killing of environmentalist Gerry Ortega in 2011.
- September 12:
  - The Sandiganbayan convicts Bucloc, Abra mayor Gody Cardenas of graft over the irregular appointment of a project consultant in 2011 and sentences him to between six and ten years' imprisonment.
  - The Manila Regional Trial Court Branch 21 convicts former customs broker Mark Taguba II and three others in connection with the May 2017 smuggling of 602.279 kilograms of shabu worth ₱6.4 billion.
- September 16–20 – A state of calamity is declared in the municipalities of Valladolid, San Enrique, and Hinigaran and the city of La Carlota in Negros Occidental due to flooding.
- September 17 – The Commission on Elections (COMELEC) issues the first ever guidelines on campaigning through social media ahead of the 2025 Philippine general election including the parallel Bangsamoro Parliament election. It includes obligations for candidates to disclose usage of AI in their campaign materials and prohibits the usage of the technology to spread misinformation against their rivals.
- September 18:
  - The Sandiganbayan releases a September 13 decision acquitting former Sulu representative Hussin Ututalum Amin of graft over his involvement in the Fertilizer Fund scam in 2004.
  - Lloyd Christopher Lao, a former official of the Department of Budget and Management accused of helping facilitate the Pharmally scandal, is arrested in Davao City.
  - Allan de Castro, the main suspect in the disappearance of Catherine Camilon, is arrested in Balayan, Batangas.
  - The Sandiganbayan acquits Janet Lim-Napoles and National Livelihood Development Council president Gondelina Amata of graft in a case of the PDAF scam involving then-La Union representative Victor Francisco Ortega, citing lack of evidence.
- September 19 – The Ombudsman imposes a six-month suspension on Tobias Fornier, Antique mayor Ernesto Tajanlangit III following a complaint filed by his vice mayor, Jose Maria Fornier, alleging grave misconduct and other abuses. However, the suspension is halted on October 30 after Tajanlangit obtains a TRO from the Court of Appeals.
- September 20:
  - The Supreme Court releases a June 26 decision striking down the requirement of resistance by the victim in proving charges of rape committed by force, threat or intimidation, citing complications arising from cases involving incest.
  - The Supreme Court rules in favor of recognizing any divorce obtained by Filipinos from foreign spouses overseas for as along as the proceeding is valid under the law of the foreign spouse's country.
- September 23 – President Marcos signs into law Republic Act No. 12021 or the Magna Carta of Filipino Seafarers.
- September 23–24 – PISTON and Manibela hold a nationwide transportation strike in protest over the Public Utility Vehicle Modernization Program.
- September 25 – COMELEC recognizes Akbayan partylist as having won one seat in the 2022 Philippine House of Representatives elections following the cancellation of the registration of An Waray partylist. The ruling allows Akbayan nominee Perci Cendaña to take office as its elected congressional representative.
- September 26:
  - President Marcos signs into law Republic Act No. 12022 or the Anti-Agricultural Economic Sabotage Act, designating the smuggling, hoarding, and cartel activities affecting agricultural products as economic sabotage.
  - The first driverless bus system in the Philippines is launched in New Clark City.
- September 27:
  - The 3.17-kilometer Panguil Bay Bridge connecting Lanao del Norte and Misamis Occidental is opened to traffic as the longest sea bridge in Mindanao.
  - The province of Misamis Occidental is declared "insurgency-free" by the government.
  - COMELEC allows voters in the Embo barangays to cast votes for the Legislative districts of Pateros–Taguig in the 2025 Philippine general election following their official transfer from Makati to Taguig.
- September 30 – The city of Isabela, Basilan, is declared free from the Abu Sayyaf Group by the government.

=== October ===
- October 1–7 – A state of calamity is declared in Ilocos Norte, Batanes and Cagayan due to damage caused by Super Typhoon Julian (Krathon). Five people are killed nationwide due to the storm, while one person is reported missing.
- October 1 – The Manila Regional Trial Court Branch 11 convicts 10 members of the Aegis Juris fraternity for the 2017 hazing death of Atio Castillo and sentences them to life imprisonment.
- October 2 – President Marcos signs into law Republic Act No. 12023, imposing a 12% value-added tax (VAT) on foreign digital service providers.
- October 3:
  - The Ombudsman orders the dismissal and perpetual disqualification of suspended Cebu City mayor Mike Rama for nepotism in a case involving the hiring of two of his brothers-in-law as city hall employees.
  - The Ombudsman releases a September 12 decision dismissing suspended Mandaue mayor Jonas Cortes from service for grave misconduct in connection with the illegal operation of a cement batching plant.
  - Indigenous rights activist Joan Carling receives the Right Livelihood Award for her role in advocating for indigenous rights in preserving the environment and her "leadership in defending people, lands and culture".
- October 4:
  - The Sandiganbayan acquits chief presidential legal counsel and former Senate president Juan Ponce Enrile, his former aide Gigi Reyes, and Janet Lim-Napoles, of plunder in connection with the pork barrel scam.
  - The Ombudsman releases a September 25 decision suspending Palompon, Leyte mayor Ramon Oñate for a year for various complaints.
- October 6:
  - Pablo Virgilio David, the president of the Catholic Bishops' Conference of the Philippines and the concurrent Bishop of Kalookan, is named a cardinal by Pope Francis. He is elevated to the College of Cardinals on December 8.
  - The Sandiganbayan releases an October 4 decision dismissing the ill-gotten wealth case against former president Ferdinand Marcos, former First Lady Imelda Marcos, former Government Service Insurance System president Roman Cruz, and Philippine Airlines involving ₱276 million worth of properties in Baguio, Manila, Makati, and California, citing inordinate delays.
- October 7 – The Supreme Court rules that the violation of ordinances and regulations does not constitute sufficient grounds for authorities to make a warrantless arrest following a case filed by a petitioner accused of illegal possession of firearms.
- October 8:
  - President Marcos signs into law Republic Act No. 12024 or the Self-Reliant Defense Posture (SRDP) Revitalization Act, providing for the development of domestic defense industries.
  - The Ombudsman imposes a six-month preventive suspension on Porac, Pampanga mayor Jaime Capil, vice mayor Francis Laurence Tamayo, and eight members of the Porac municipal council over their role in facilitating the operations of an illegal POGO in the municipality.
- October 9:
  - The Sandiganbayan acquits former Zamboanga del Sur governor Aurora Cerilles of graft in the purchase of furniture for government offices without public bidding in 2009.
  - The Sandiganbayan convicts Evelyn De Leon, the president of the NGO Philippine Social Development Foundation, Inc., of graft in a case of the pork barrel scam involving Cagayan de Oro representative Rufus Rodriguez and sentences her to up to 39 years' imprisonment.
- October 11:
  - A bill discontinuing the use of the mother tongue as a teaching medium in Kindergarten and early grade levels, which has been mandatory since 2013, lapses into law as Republic Act No. 12027.
  - The Court of Appeals releases a September 26 decision overturning the Ombudsman's dismissal in December 2023 of Aurora governor Christian Noveras for misconduct, citing errors on the part of the Ombudsman.
- October 16:
  - The Taguig RTC convicts 17 members of the Abu Sayyaf Group, including Rajah Solaiman Movement founder Hilarion Del Rosario Santos III, for their participation in the 2000 Sipadan kidnappings and sentences them to life imprisonment.
  - The European Journal of Taxonomy announces the discovery of a new species of king cobra endemic to Luzon called the Luzon king cobra (Ophiophagus salvatana).
- October 17:
  - The Land Transportation Franchising and Regulatory Board reopens the consolidation period for public utility vehicles under the Public Utility Vehicle Modernization Program until November 29.
  - The Sandiganbayan acquits former Postmaster-General Maria Josefina dela Cruz of graft in the appointment of a department head in the Philippine Postal Corporation in 2011.
- October 18:
  - President Marcos signs into law Republic Act No. 12028 or the Academic Recovery and Accessible Learning (ARAL) Program Law, allowing students to take refresher courses during the summer break.
  - The Ombudsman imposes a preventive suspension on Albay governor Edcel Greco Lagman on suspicion of involvement in jueteng.
  - The Sandiganbayan convicts former Maguindanao governor Sajid Ampatuan of graft involving unfinished road projects valued at P400 million and sentences him to life imprisonment.
- October 21 – Simeon Naogsan, the spokesperson of the Cordillera People's Democratic Front, is arrested in Bacarra, Ilocos Norte.
- October 22–November 7 – A state of calamity is declared in the provinces of Albay, Batangas, Camarines Norte, Camarines Sur, Catanduanes, Cavite and Sorsogon; the cities of Dagupan, Naga and Quezon; as well as in parts of Cagayan, Cotabato, Eastern Samar, Ifugao, Isabela, Laguna, Masbate, Northern Samar, Quezon and Samar due to damage caused by Tropical Storm Kristine (Trami). At least 151 people are killed nationwide due to the storm, while 21 others are reported missing. A day of national mourning for the victims of Kristine is declared by President Marcos on November 4.
- October 24 – Wigberto "Baylon" Villarico, the suspected acting chair of the Communist Party of the Philippines, is arrested in Quezon City.
- October 30 – The Spanish-era Santa Maria de Mayan Church in Itbayat, Batanes is destroyed by extreme weather brought about by Supertyphoon Leon (Kong-rey).
- October 31:
  - The Supreme Court releases an April 29 decision ultimately dismissing petitions for protective writs filed by human rights groups against then president Rodrigo Duterte and ranking law enforcement officials allegedly involved in the killings of human rights workers.
  - The Supreme Court releases a June ruling stating that it is not the duty of city and municipal mayors to remit contributions of local government employees to the GSIS in a case against Santo Tomas, Isabela mayor Antonio Talaue that results in his acquittal.

=== November ===
- November 5:
  - President Marcos enacts Executive Order No. 74, imposing an official and immediate ban on POGOs, online gaming and related activities in the Philippines.
  - The Sandiganbayan acquits former Veterans Federation of the Philippines President Bonifacio De Gracia of graft involving the signing of lease agreements over properties in Taguig with a private firm.
- November 7:
  - President Marcos signs into law Republic Act No. 12063 or the Enterprise-Based Education and Training (EBET) Framework Act, promoting private-sector partnerships to reduce job mismatches among Filipino workers.
  - The Sandiganbayan acquits former Food and Drug Administration director general Nela Charade Puno of graft involving the agency's closure of a clinic selling unregistered products in Tarlac in 2018, citing lack of violation of due process.
- November 8:
  - A state of calamity is declared in Pagudpud, Ilocos Norte and Buguey, Cagayan due to damage caused by Typhoon Marce (Yinxing). One person is killed by the storm, while another is reported missing.
  - President Marcos signs into law Republic Acts No. 12064 or the Philippine Maritime Zones Act, defining the Philippines' maritime jurisdiction and rights within the said territory, and 12065 or the Philippine Archipelagic Sea Lanes Act, establishing three archipelagic sea lanes to be opened for use by foreign ships and aircraft transiting through the country.
  - The Supreme Court releases an August decision ruling that convictions of public officials for violating procurement laws do not automatically qualify as a conviction for graft in a case involving the acquittal of five officials of the Davao City Water District.
- November 11 – President Marcos signs into law Republic Act No. 12066 or the Corporate Recovery and Tax Incentives for Enterprises to Maximize Opportunities for Reinvigorating the Economy (CREATE MORE) Act, imposing a series of investment and fiscal reforms to promote economic growth.
- November 13–14 – A state of calamity is declared in the municipalities of Dilasag in Aurora, Paracelis in Mountain Province and Cabagan in Isabela due to damage caused by Typhoon Nika (Toraji).
- November 15 – The Sandiganbayan acquits former Santa Barbara, Iloilo mayor Isabelo Maquino of graft over the bidding of public works projects in the municipality.
- November 16 – The first phase of the LRT-1 extension from Baclaran to Dr. Santos stations in Parañaque begins commercial operations.
- November 18 – The Philippines and the United States sign the General Security of Military Information Agreement, allowing for the sharing of classified information of benefit between Washington and Manila.
- November 19–28 – A state of calamity is declared in the provinces of Aurora, Isabela, and Nueva Vizcaya, as well as in the city of Tabuk, Kalinga due to damage caused by Super Typhoon Pepito (Man-yi).
- November 19 – The Sandiganbayan approves a compromise agreement between the PCGG and the heirs of deceased Marcos associate Roman Cruz Jr, allowing the former to claim properties in Antipolo and Baguio as well as stocks in PLDT in exchange for the PCGG surrendering claims to a property in Makati.
- November 19 – The Supreme Court releases an August 20 ruling barring Rowena Guanzon from taking office as the first nominee of P3PWD party-list in the 2022 Philippine House of Representatives elections by nullifying her nomination, citing grave abuse of discretion by COMELEC in approving her substitution past the designated deadline.
- November 21 – Terra Solar Philippines Inc. begins construction of the Meralco Terra Solar Project, considered the largest integrated solar and battery storage facility in the world spanning 3,500-hectares and a projected output of 8,000 megawatts, in Peñaranda, Nueva Ecija.
- November 22 – A state of calamity is declared in Dasmariñas, Cavite due to an outbreak of dengue.
- November 24 – Strong fires destroy over a thousand homes in the Isla Puting Bato barangay of downtown Manila, displacing around 8,000 people.

=== December ===
- December 2:
  - An impeachment complaint is filed in the House of Representatives against Vice President Sara Duterte for 24 offenses including failure to account for her spending of confidential funds, involvement in extrajudicial killings and threatening the assassination of President Marcos and House Speaker Martin Romualdez.
  - The vice mayor of Marawi, Lanao del Sur, Annouar Abdulrauf, is arrested for the murder of an NBI operative in 2013.
- December 4 – A second impeachment complaint is filed in the House of Representatives against Vice President Sara Duterte for misuse of confidential funds.
- December 5 – A helicopter of the Philippine Navy crashes at Naval Base Cavite in Cavite City, injuring its five occupants.
- December 6:
  - President Marcos signs into law Republic Acts No. 12076 or the Ligtas Pinoy Centers Act, which mandates the construction of permanent evacuation centers, and 12077 or the Student Loan Payment Moratorium During Disasters Emergencies Act, mandating financial aid for students in disaster-affected areas.
  - The Sandiganbayan dismisses two ill-gotten wealth cases filed against former president Ferdinand Marcos, former first lady Imelda Marcos, former defense minister Juan Ponce Enrile and Marcos associate Danding Cojuangco relating to the Coco Levy Fund scam after the government files for a withdrawal due to ongoing compromise negotiations.
  - The first case of avian influenza of the H5N2 variant is discovered in a duck farm in Talisay, Camarines Norte.
- December 9:
  - President Marcos signs into law Republic Acts No. 12078 or the Agricultural Tariffication Act, amending the Rice Tariffication Law, 12079 establishing a VAT Refund System for foreign tourists purchasing domestic goods and 12080 or the Basic Education Mental Health and Well-Being Promotion Act, mandating the establishment and implementation of mental health and well-being programs in schools.
  - PHIVOLCS raises Alert Level 3 over Mount Kanlaon after an explosive eruption. A state of calamity is subsequently declared in Negros Occidental on December 14.
  - A state of calamity is declared in the islands of Siargao and Bucas Grande in Surigao del Norte due to an ongoing power outage that began on December 1.
  - The Office of the President imposes a two-month suspension on Abra governor Dominic Valera for failing to follow the rules of succession in the replacement of a deceased municipal councilor of Bucay in 2023.
- December 12 – The Sandiganbayan dismisses the final six ill-gotten wealth cases relating to the Coco Levy Fund scam filed against former president Ferdinand Marcos, former first lady Imelda Marcos, former defense minister Juan Ponce Enrile, former Zamboanga City mayor Maria Clara Lobregat, and Marcos associates Danding Cojuangco, Cesar Zalamea and Jesus Pineda, citing inordinate delay and double jeopardy arising from the dismissal of identical cases against Cojuangco in the Supreme Court.
- December 17 – The mayor of Pandi, Bulacan, Rico Roque, is arrested along with two people on suspicion of rape.
- December 18 – Indonesia–Philippines relations: Mary Jane Veloso, who has been on death row in Indonesia after being convicted for drug trafficking in 2010, returns to the country after President Marcos announces on November 20 that the governments of the Philippines and of Indonesia reach a deal for her repatriation.
- December 19:
  - A third impeachment complaint is filed in the House of Representatives against Vice President Sara Duterte for betrayal of public trust.
  - The Supreme Court, upholding the decision of the Malabon Regional Trial Court, allows commercial fishing within the 15-kilometer municipal water zone.
- December 20:
  - The Supreme Court releases an August 19 ruling allowing large commercial fishing firms to operate in municipal waters, defined as extending 15 kilometers from a coastline and previously reserved to small-scale fishermen under the Fisheries Code, after affirming an earlier ruling by the Malabon RTC in favor of Mercidar Fishing Corporation.
  - A court in Taguig convicts Moro Islamic Liberation Front commanders Abubakar Guiaman and Mohammad Ali Tambako of homicide over the deaths of 35 members of the PNP-Special Action Force during the Mamasapano clash in 2015 and sentences them to 14 years' imprisonment.
- December 23 – The Bangko Sentral ng Pilipinas introduces new banknotes of the Philippine peso made of polymer.
- December 24 – A state of calamity is declared in Baco, Oriental Mindoro due to flooding caused by Tropical Depression Romina (Pabuk).
- December 28:
  - A state of calamity is declared in Biliran due to the partial closure of the Biliran Bridge caused by structural damage.
  - A state of calamity is declared in Malita and Don Marcelino, Davao Occidental due to flooding and landslides caused by an intertropical convergence zone.
- December 29 – Cambodia–Philippines relations: Thirteen Filipino women convicted of violating Cambodia's ban on surrogacy return to the country after being pardoned by King Norodom Sihamoni.

== Holidays ==
On October 13, 2023, the national government released through Proclamation No. 368, series of 2023 dated October 11, 2023 declaring the regular, national, special, and additional special days. The EDSA People Power Revolution Anniversary is dropped from the list of special non-working holidays.

=== Regular ===
- January 1 – New Year's Day
- March 28 – Maundy Thursday
- March 29 – Good Friday
- April 9 – Araw ng Kagitingan (Day of Valor)
- April 10 – Eid'l Fitr
- May 1 – Labor Day
- June 12 – Independence Day
- June 17 – Eid al-Adha
- August 26 – National Heroes Day
- November 30 – Bonifacio Day
- December 25 – Christmas Day
- December 30 – Rizal Day

=== Special (Non-working) ===
- February 9 – Chinese New Year
- March 30 – Black Saturday
- August 23 – Ninoy Aquino Day (Adjusted from August 21 by virtue of Proclamation No. 665, series of 2024.)
- November 1 – All Saints Day
- November 2 – All Souls' Day
- December 8 – Feast of the Immaculate Conception
- December 24 – Christmas Eve
- December 31 – Last Day of the Year

== Business and economy ==
=== January ===
- January 29 – The Philippine Ports Authority awards International Container Terminal Services (ICTSI) with a 25-year contract to operate and develop the Iloilo Commercial Port Complex in Lapuz. ICTSI begins operating the port, which is renamed the Visayas Container Terminal, on April 15.

=== February ===
- February 13 – Finance Secretary Ralph Recto announces the cancellation of the merger between the Land Bank of the Philippines and the Development Bank of the Philippines.
- February 16 – The Department of Transportation awards a consortium led by the San Miguel Corporation with a ₱170-billion contract to oversee the rehabilitation of Ninoy Aquino International Airport, The agreement is finalized on March 18, with the turnover of the airport commencing on September 14.
- February 22 – The planned sale of SkyCable to PLDT is called off following a mutual decision between the latter and SkyCable's parent company ABS-CBN.

=== March ===
- March 4 – Meralco, Aboitiz Power and San Miguel Global Power Holdings Corporation announce a ₱168 billion ($3.3 billion) agreement to establish the Philippines' first integrated liquefied natural gas facility in Batangas, which is expected to generate 1,320 megawatts of electricity by the end of the year.
- March 8 – The Supreme Court nullifies an order from the Department of Labor and Employment for PLDT to regularize more than 7,000 subcontracted employees, but orders the firm to regularize those involved in the installation, repair and maintenance services of its lines citing their importance to its business.
- March 10 – The Supreme Court denies Now Telecom's claims for operational frequencies from the National Telecommunications Commission (NTC), effectively preventing its bid to become the Philippines' third major telecommunications network after the court concurs with the NTC's requirements for Now to enter the market.
- March 15 – Prime Energy Resources Development B.V. awards a $69.9-million contract to the UK-based contractor Noble Viking to drill three wells in the Malampaya gas field.
- March 18 – San Miguel Corporation President and CEO Ramon Ang announces the cancellation of the proposed Pasig River Expressway project following criticism over its impact on traffic, the environment and architectural heritage. However, on May 27, Ang says that the project is "on hold".
- March 25 – The Securities and Exchange Commission (SEC) asks the NTC to block access to the cryptocurrency firm Binance in the Philippines, saying that it “poses a threat to the security of the funds of investing Filipinos.”.
- March 29 – Central Azucarera Don Pedro, formerly the largest manufacturer of raw sugar in the Philippines, ceases operations after 97 years.

=== April ===
- April 10 – The Supreme Court upholds an arbitral ruling ordering the Camp John Hay Development Corporation to vacate a 247-hectare property in the John Hay Special Economic Zone in Baguio that it had leased from the Bases Conversion and Development Authority, while ordering the latter to refund the firm's total rent paid amounting to ₱1.4 billion.
- April 12 – The Philippines announces the establishment of the Luzon Economic Corridor to develop the economic hubs of Subic Bay, Clark, Metro Manila and Batangas with US and Japanese financial assistance.
- April 14 – The SEC releases an April 8 decision imposing fines totaling ₱560 million on the Abra Mining & Industrial Corporation for trading in fraudulent shares from 2015 to 2019.
- April 23 – Advanced Media Broadcasting System (AMBS) and ABS-CBN sign an agreement to broadcast the latter's programs through free-to-air channel ALLTV.

=== June ===
- June 4 – The Makati Regional Trial Court releases a May 28 decision convicting Calata Corporation CEO Joseph Calata and corporate secretary Jose Marie Fabella of violating the Securities Regulation Code by misleading investors to buy shares into a planned resort-casino complex in Cebu despite not having a gambling license from PAGCOR in the first place and sentences them to pay ₱4 million in fines each or undergo imprisonment.
- June 13 – Republic Act No. 11999, or the Bulacan Special Economic Zone and Freeport Act, which establishes the Bulacan Special Economic Zone and Freeport and the Bulacan Special Economic Zone and Freeport Authority, lapses into law.

=== July ===
- July 1 – The Sofitel Philippine Plaza Manila hotel in Pasay ceases operations after 48 years.
- July 2 – Cebu Pacific announces the purchase of 152 aircraft from Airbus valued at a total of US$24 billion (₱1.4 trillion), in what is deemed the largest aircraft order in the history of Philippine aviation. The agreement is finalized on October 2.
- July 3 – The Department of Public Works and Highways awards a concession for San Miguel Corporation to build a 60-kilometer extension of the Tarlac–Pangasinan–La Union Expressway from Rosario to San Juan, La Union.
- July 7 – President Marcos issues Proclamation No. 623 establishing a special economic zone in Victoria, Tarlac.
- July 19 – PXP Energy Corporation returns a contract to explore and develop the Linapacan block off the coast of Palawan to the government, citing the absence of prospective energy reserves.

=== August ===
- August 2 – The Supreme Court releases a July 30 ruling stating that electric cooperatives do not have the constitutional right to an exclusive franchise within their coverage areas following a petition by Iloilo Electric Cooperative, Inc. I, II and III challenging the expansion of the franchise of its rival MORE Electric and Power Corporation.
- August 27 – President Marcos issues Proclamation No. 668 establishing a special economic zone at The Grid building in Mandurriao, Iloilo City and expanding the Lima Technology Center in Malvar, Batangas.

=== September ===
- September 6 – The Supreme Court releases a February 13, 2023 ruling stating that the NTC cannot impose billing rates for telecommunications firms without due process following a case filed by the latter over rates imposed in 2009.
- September 27 – The Supreme Court releases an April 3 ruling stating that the usage by employers of demotion, verbal abuse and indifferent behavior leading to the departure of an employee constitutes constructive illegal dismissal following a case filed by a former employee of a Toyota subsidiary based in Quezon City.
- September 30:
  - The first electric vehicle battery plant in the Philippines is inaugurated in New Clark City.
  - The Department of Transportation awards Aboitiz InfraCapital with a ₱12.75-billion contract to oversee the rehabilitation of Laguindingan Airport.

=== October ===
- October 2 – President Marcos issues Proclamation No. 701 establishing a special economic zone in Tarlac City.
- October 7 – The Department of Tourism and the South Korean counterpart sign an agreement renewing their five-year tourism cooperation program which will be effective until 2029.

=== November ===
- November 27 – The Department of Transportation awards Aboitiz InfraCapital with a ₱4.53-billion contract to oversee the rehabilitation of Bohol–Panglao International Airport.

=== December ===
- December 23 – Philippines–South Korea relations: President Marcos issues Executive Order No. 80, implementing the free trade agreement between the Philippines and South Korea, which takes effect on December 31.

== Entertainment and culture ==
=== January ===
- January 19 – Pearl Hung finishes as third runner-up at Miss Global 2023 in Vietnam.
- January 27:
  - Hanna Therese Cruz finishes as first runner-up at Miss Global Asian 2024 in Malaysia.
  - The Pope Pius XII Catholic Center in Manila is officially declared an important cultural property by the National Museum of the Philippines.
- January 29 – Michelle Arceo finishes as second runner-up at Reina Hispanoamericana 2023 in Bolivia.

=== February ===
- February 1 – TV5 launches RPTV, which occupies the television channel formerly operated by CNN Philippines.
- February 9 – The San Guillermo De Aquitania Church in Dalaguete, Cebu, is officially declared a national cultural treasure by the National Museum.
- February 11 – The campus of St. Scholastica's College, Manila is officially declared an important cultural property by the National Museum.
- February 13 – Four colonial-era panels stolen from Boljoon Church in Cebu in the 1980s are donated to the National Museum by Union Bank of the Philippines CEO Edwin Bautista, leading to questions about their provenance and demands from the Archdiocese of Cebu as well as provincial officials and residents of Boljoon for the panels to be returned. On May 8, the museum's board of trustees rules in favor of returning the panels to Boljoon Church.
- February 14 – Kalinga tattoo artist Whang-od is awarded the Presidential Medal of Merit by President Marcos.
- February 18 – The Miss Philippines Organization announces the appointments of Alethea Ambrosio, Blessa Ericha Figueroa, Isabelle delos Santos, Chantal Elise Schmidt and Hanna Reese Uyan as the country's representatives in international pageants (Miss Supranational, Miss Asia Pacific International, Miss Aura International, Miss Eco International, and Miss Eco Teen). However, on August 3, the Miss Eco Teen organization announces that Raven Doctor as its contestant, without providing an explanation as to Uyan's removal.

=== March ===
- March 1 – The Philippines wins the Guinness World Record for the most variety of pork dishes on display, with 313 items, during the launch of the five-day National Hog Festival at Gateway Mall 2 in Quezon City.
- March 4 – Thea Casuncad of Laguna is crowned Miss Supermodel Worldwide Philippines 2024 in the pageant's coronation night held at the Manila Hotel.
- March 9 – Gwendolyne Fourniol finishes unplaced at Miss World 2023 in India.
- March 16 – The Philippines wins the Guinness World Record for the largest human lung formation, with 5,596 participants attending an event to mark World Tuberculosis Day at the Quirino Grandstand in Manila.
- March 22 – Maria Gigante is crowned Universal Woman 2024 in Cambodia.
- March 23 – Muzaher Suweb Bito of Maguindanao del Sur finishes third at the 27th Dubai International Holy Quran Contest in the United Arab Emirates.

=== April ===
- April 6 – The University of the Philippines College of Law wins the 2024 Philip C. Jessup International Law Moot Court Competition in Washington D.C., making it the third Filipino competitor to win the event in its history.
- April 13 – Visual artist Elvin Perocho Vitor of Bohol receives the Leonardo da Vinci International Award in Italy.
- April 14 – Radio station Wave 89.1 FM ceases operations after 49 years on air.
- April 28 – Chantal Schmidt finishes as first runner-up at Miss Eco International 2024 in Egypt.

=== May ===
- Undated – Thea Casuncad is crowned Miss Supermodel Worldwide 2024 in India.
- May 11 – Irha Mel Alfeche of Matanao, Davao del Sur is crowned Miss Philippines Earth 2024 in the pageant's coronation event held in Talakag, Bukidnon.
- May 22:
  - Chelsea Manalo of Bulacan is crowned Miss Universe Philippines 2024 in the pageant's coronation night held at the SM Mall of Asia Arena in Pasay.
  - The wreckage of the US Navy submarine USS Harder, which was sunk in action in 1944 during World War II, is discovered off the coast of Pangasinan.
- May 23:
  - The Pamilacan Watchtower in Baclayon, Bohol, is officially declared a national cultural treasure by the National Museum.
  - The Miss Philippines Organization announces the appointments of Tarah Valencia, Cyrille Payumo, Alexie Mae Brooks and Ahtisa Manalo as the country's representatives in international pageants (Miss Supranational, Miss Charm, Miss Eco International, and Miss Cosmo).
- May 26 – Kenneth Stromsnes finishes as second runner-up at the Manhunt International 2024 pageant in Thailand.

=== June ===
- June 2 – Miss Charm Philippines 2023 Krishnah Gravidez relinquishes her crown in the Miss Charm International pageant and is replaced on July 6 by Kayla Jean Carter. On June 3, Gravidez is declared as Baguio’s official delegate to the Miss World Philippines 2024 competition.
- June 15 – The municipality of Tampakan, South Cotabato wins the Guinness World Record for the most pedicures given in eight hours, with 1,223 participants.
- June 20:
  - The Archdiocesan Shrine of Our Lady of Caysasay in Taal, Batangas, is officially declared a national cultural treasure by the National Museum.
  - Radio station DWAN 1206 AM resumes operations after 13 years off air.
- June 22 – The Pride PH Festival is held in Quezon City with 200,000 people attending the event.
- June 30 – Marvin Diamante of Laguna is crowned Mister International Philippines 2024.

=== July ===
- July 3 – The 1936 Fernando Amorsolo painting Mango Harvesters is stolen from the Hofileña Ancestral House in Silay, Negros Occidental. It is recovered in Quezon City on July 11 by the National Bureau of Investigation, which arrests two people on suspicion of trying to sell the artwork.
- July 4 – Brandon Espiritu finishes as second runner-up at Mister Supranational 2024 in Poland.
- July 5 – The province of Apayao is declared a biosphere reserve by UNESCO.
- July 6 – Alethea Ambrosio finishes in the top 12 at Miss Supranational 2024 in Poland.
- July 7 – Myrna Esguerra of Abra is crowned Binibining Pilipinas 2024 in the pageant's coronation night held at the Araneta Coliseum in Quezon City.
- July 19 – Krishnah Gravidez of Baguio is crowned Miss World Philippines 2024 in the pageant's coronation night held at the SM Mall of Asia Arena in Pasay.
- July 22 – The northern Luzon-based weekly newspaper Baguio Midland Courier ceases operations after 77 years.

=== August ===
- August 8 – Romulo Davide is proclaimed as a National Scientist of the Philippines by President Marcos for his work in nematology and plant pathology.
- August 12 – President Marcos declares August 13, 2024 to August 12, 2025, the centennial year for Ilocano master weaver and national living treasure Magdalena Gamayo.
- August 18 – Nathaniel Tiu is crowned Mister Earth International 2024 in Colombia.
- August 24 – Sophia Nicole Arkanghel finishes in the top six at Miss International Queen 2024 in Thailand.
- August 26 – John Bench Ortiz finishes as first runner-up at Mister Gay World 2024 in the United Kingdom.

=== September ===
- September 13:
  - Juvyel Anne Saluta becomes the first Filipino to win the Miss Elite pageant held in Egypt.
  - The St. La Salle Hall of the De La Salle University in Manila is officially declared an important cultural property by the National Museum.
- September 19 – Jeanne Isabelle Bilasano becomes the first Filipino to win the Face of Beauty International pageant held in Taiwan.
- September 29 – Christine Opiaza of Zambales is crowned Miss Grand Philippines 2024 in the pageant's coronation night held at the Newport Performing Arts Theater in Pasay.

=== October ===
- October 5 – Ahtisa Manalo finishes in the top 10 at Miss Cosmo 2024 in Vietnam.
- October 6 – Daumier Corilla is crowned Mister Global 2024 in Thailand.
- October 7 – Blessa Figueroa finishes as third runner-up at Miss Asia Pacific International 2024 in Pasay.
- October 15 – Jasmin Bungay finishes as second runner-up at Miss Globe 2024 in Albania.
- October 18:
  - Isabelle De Los Santos finishes as first runner-up at Miss Aura International 2024 in Turkey.
  - The Philippines wins the Guinness World Record for the most participants in a simultaneous bamboo planting session, with 2,305 individuals participating across 19 locations in Leyte and Mindanao.
- October 25 – Christine Opiaza finishes as first runner-up at Miss Grand International 2024 in Thailand.
- October 31 – Raven Doctor finishes as third runner-up at Miss Eco Teen 2024 in Egypt.

=== November ===
- November 9 – Irha Mel Alfeche finishes in the top 12 at Miss Earth 2024 in Parañaque, with Jessica Lane of Australia winning the title.
- November 10 – The Mister International 2024 competition is held at the Toledo City Megadome in Toledo, Cebu, with Francisco Zafra of Spain winning the title and the Philippines' Marvin Diamante finishing as second runner-up.
- November 12 – Angelica Lopez finishes unplaced at Miss International 2024 in Japan.
- November 17 – Chelsea Manalo finishes in the Top 30 at Miss Universe 2024 in Arena CDMX, Mexico.
- November 20 –
  - Samantha Acosta finishes as second runner-up at Miss CosmoWorld 2024 in Malaysia.
  - The 1976 Eddie Romero-directed film Ganito Kami Noon... Paano Kayo Ngayon? is included in the UNESCO list for the Memory of the World Programme.
- November 23 – Kirk Bondad finishes in the Top 20 at Mister World 2024 in Vietnam.
- November 30:
  - Jasmin Ariola is crowned Miss Deaf Universe 2024 in Poland.
  - Arjay Lopez finishes as first runner-up at Mister Deaf Universe 2024 in Poland.

=== December ===
- December 3 – The Sibugay Wetland Nature Reserve in Zamboanga Sibugay and the Del Carmen Mangrove Reserve in Surigao del Norte are recognized as Ramsar sites by the Ramsar Convention.
- December 7 – Alyssa Marie Redondo finishes as second runner-up at Miss Intercontinental 2024 in Egypt.
- December 9 – The inaugural edition of the Mrs. Earth pageant is held at the SMX Convention Center Manila in Pasay, with Vu Thi Hoa of Vietnam winning the title.
- December 13:
  - Yana Barrido is crowned Miss Tourism International 2024 in Malaysia.
  - Patricia Payumo is crowned Miss Star International 2024 in Brazil.
- December 14 – Justine Ong finishes in the top six at Mister International 2024 in Thailand.
- December 21 – Kayla Carter finishes in the top 20 at Miss Charm 2024 in Vietnam.
- December 22 – Markki Stroem finishes as fourth runner-up at Mister Universe 2024 in the United States.

== Deaths ==
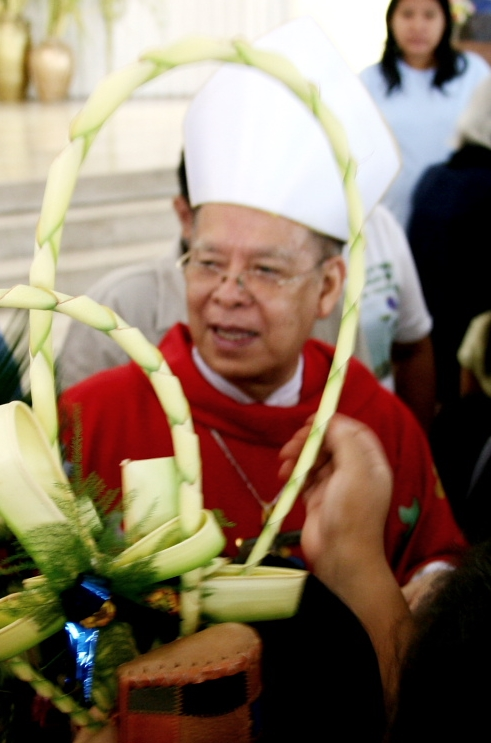
Fernando Capalla

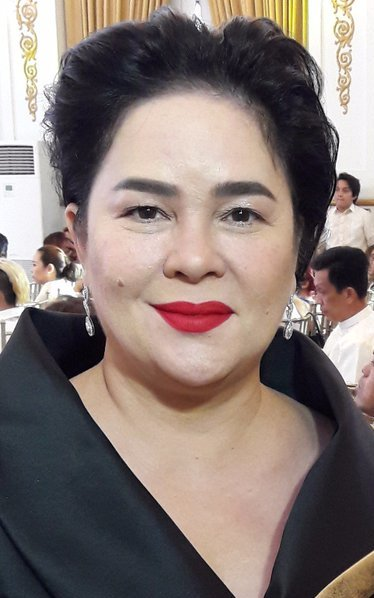
Jaclyn Jose

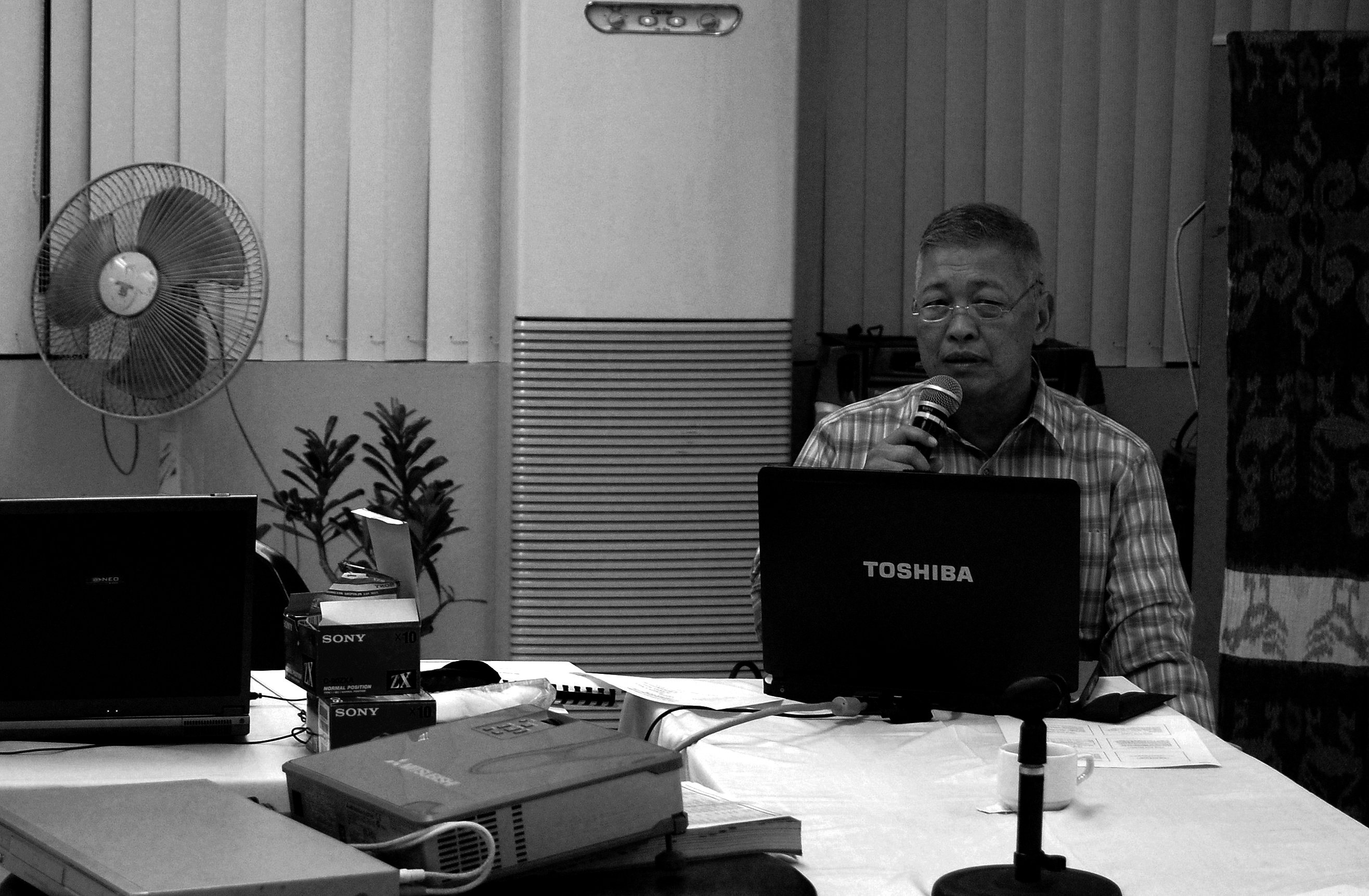
Victor Corpus

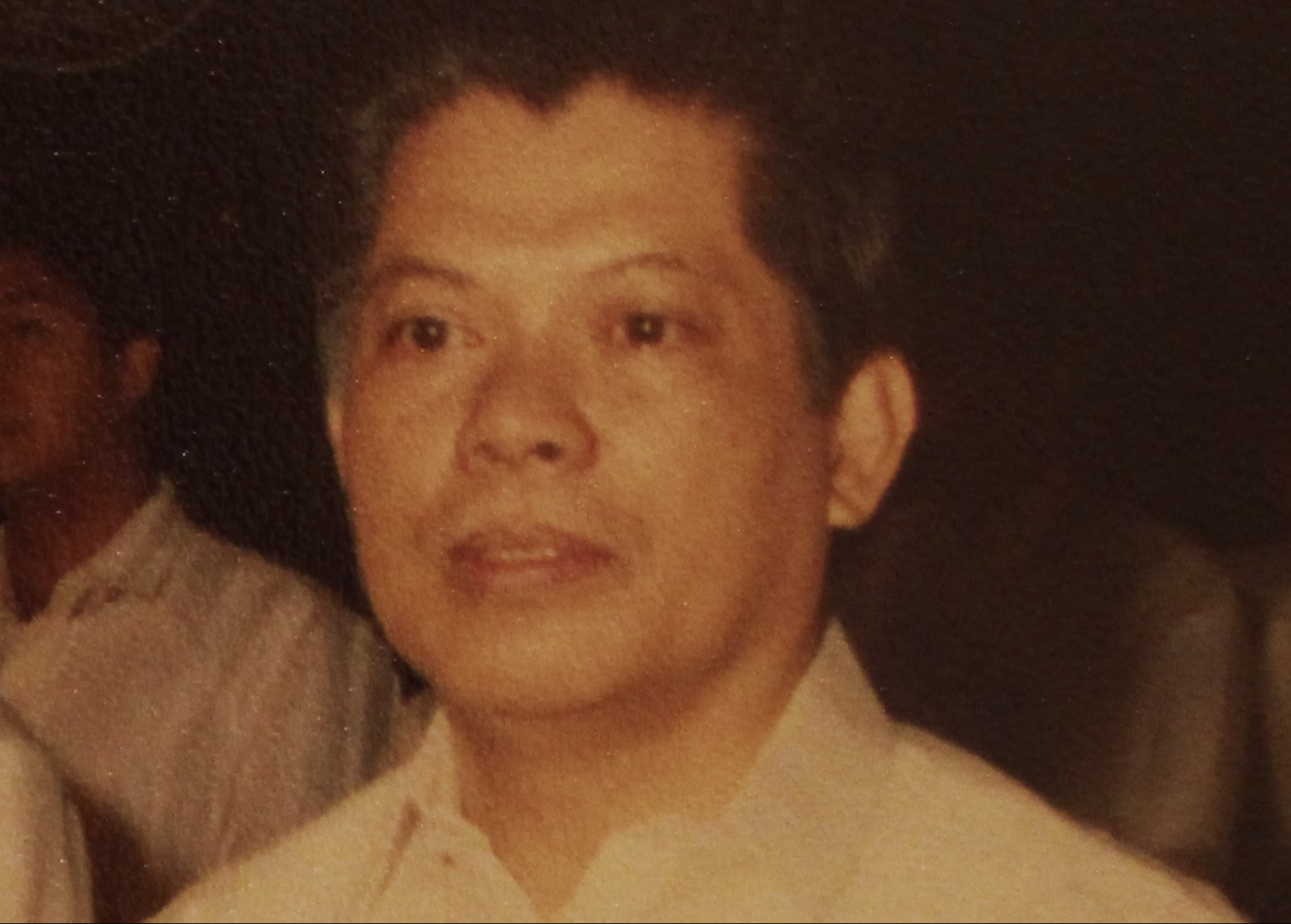
Rene Saguisag

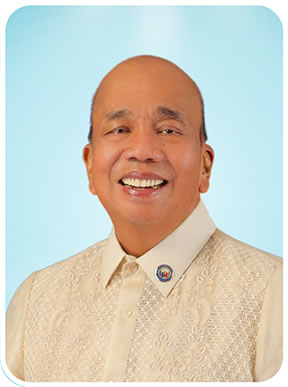
Elpidio Barzaga Jr.

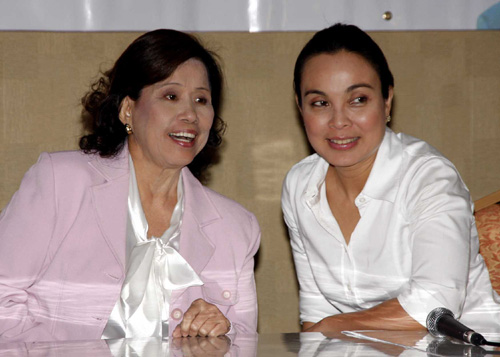
Lily Monteverde (left)

Federico Caballero

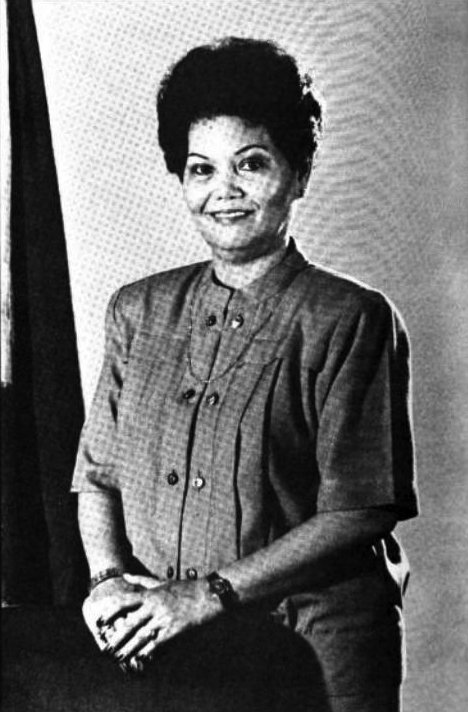
Glenda Ecleo

Temario Rivera

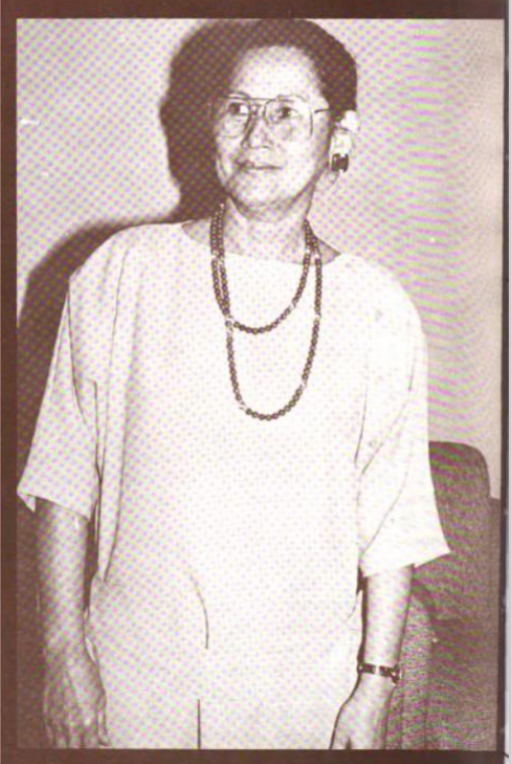
Santanina Rasul

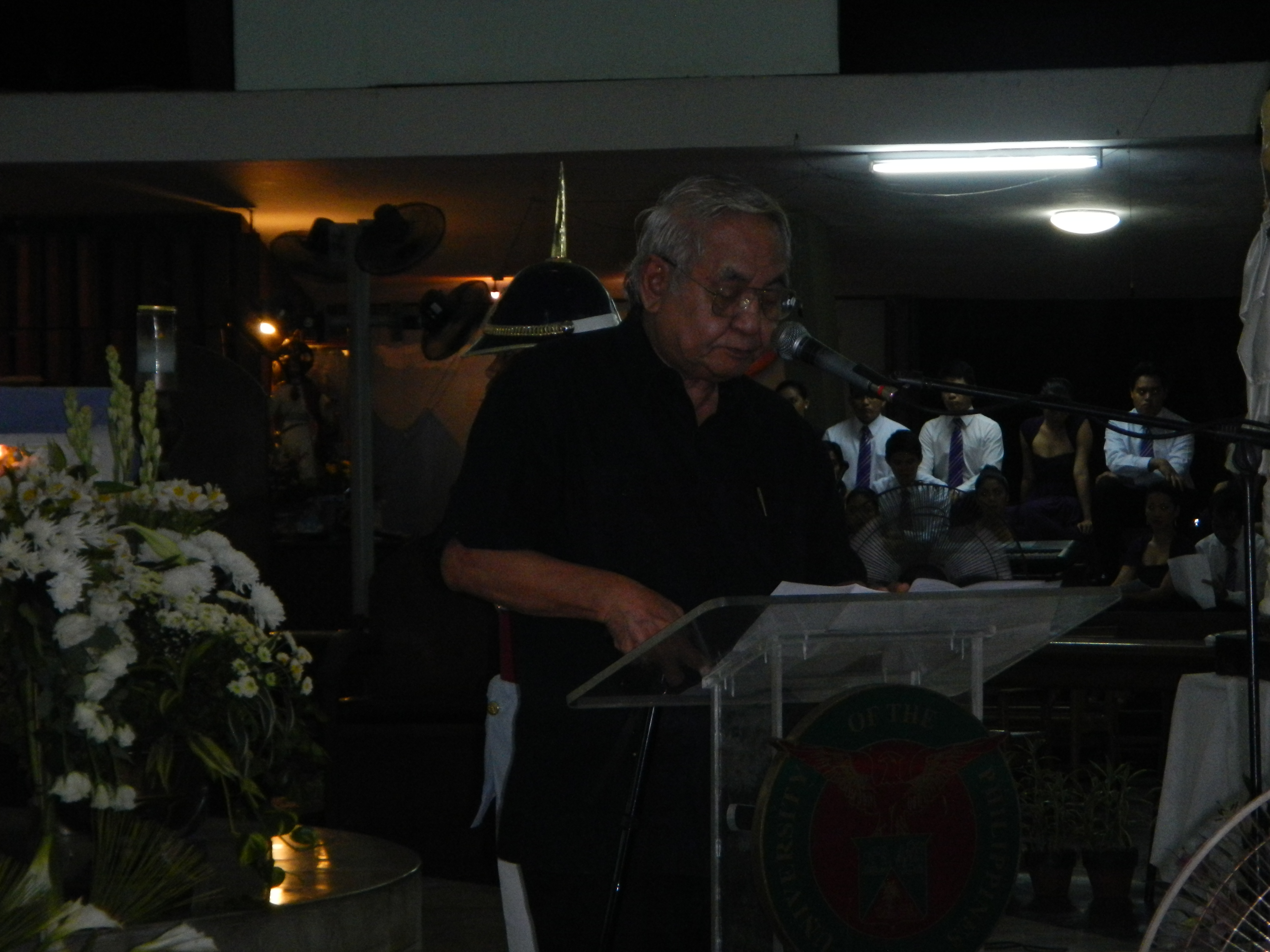
Francisco Nemenzo Jr.

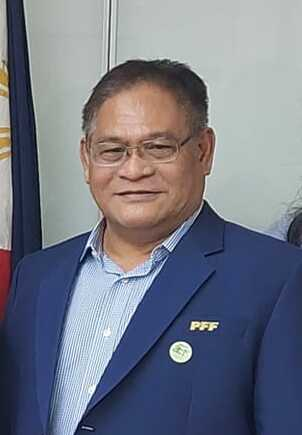
Edwin Gastanes

=== January ===
- January 2 – Ronald Lunas (b. 1966), bishop of Pagadian (since 2018)
- January 6 – Fernando Capalla (b. 1934), archbishop of Davao (1996–2012)
- January 18 – Romy Vitug (b. 1937), cinematographer

=== February ===
- February 1:
  - Honesto Chaves Pacana (b. 1933), bishop of Malaybalay (1994–2010)
  - Nereo Odchimar (b. 1940), bishop of Tandag (2001–2018)
- February 8 – Lauro Baja (b. 1937), former foreign affairs undersecretary and permanent representative to the United Nations (2003–2006)
- February 19 – Tikoy Aguiluz (b. 1952), film director
- February 26 – Santiago B. Villafania (b. 1971), poet
- February 27 – Egai Talusan Fernandez (b. 1955), painter

=== March ===
- March 2 – Jaclyn Jose (b. 1963), actress
- March 6 – Jose Concepcion Jr. (b. 1931), president and COO of RFM Corporation (1965–1986), delegate to the Philippine Constitutional Convention of 1971 from Rizal, co-founder of NAMFREL and Secretary of Trade and Industry (1986–1991)
- March 12 – Ernesto Dela Peña (b. 1932), composer
- March 13 – Edgardo Salvame (b. 1963), representative of the 1st district of Palawan (since 2024)
- March 14 – Socorro Acosta (b. 1934), representative of the 1st district of Bukidnon (1987–1988)
- March 21 – Zenaida Seva (b. 1944), astrologer

=== April ===
- April 4 – Victor Corpus (b. 1944), AFP and NPA defector, chief of the Intelligence Service of the Armed Forces of the Philippines (2001–2003)
- April 7 – Kathleen Okubo (b. 1953), journalist
- April 24 – Rene Saguisag (b. 1939), human rights lawyer, presidential spokesperson (1986–1987) and senator (1987–1992)
- April 27 – Elpidio Barzaga Jr. (b. 1950), representative of the fourth district of Cavite (2007–2016, since 2019) and mayor of Dasmariñas, Cavite (1986–1987, 1998–2007, 2016–2019)

=== May ===
- May 7 – Ignatius Jones (b. 1957), singer and journalist
- May 18 – Araceli Limcaco-Dans (b. 1929), painter and Presidential Medal of Merit recipient
- May 25:
  - Carlo J. Caparas (b. 1944), comic strip creator, film director and producer
  - Janisa Johnson (b. 1991), American Premier Volleyball League player (BaliPure Purest Water Defenders, Petro Gazz Angels) and Finals MVP (2019 Reinforced Conference)

=== June ===
- June 18:
  - Armando "Bing" Lao (b. 1948), film director and screenwriter
  - Yoyong Martirez (b. 1946), basketball player, comedian, and vice mayor of Pasig (2004–2013)
  - CJ de Silva-Ong (b. 1987), model and visual artist
- June 21 – Geneva Lopez (b. 1997), Mutya ng Pilipinas beauty pageant contestant representing Pampanga
- June 30 – Manny Castañeda (b. 1954), actor and director

=== July ===
- July 2 – Ramon Montaño (b. 1937), Chief of the Philippine Constabulary and concurrent Director General of the Integrated National Police (1988–1990)
- July 6 – Lamberto Antonio (b. 1946), poet
- July 13:
  - Chino Trinidad (b. 1967), sports journalist, commentator and league commissioner
  - Clare R. Baltazar (b. 1927), entomologist and national scientist
- July 19 – Josefina Constantino (b. 1920), Catholic nun, essayist and poet
- July 31 – Carmen Pateña (b. 1941), singer

=== August ===
- August 2 – Henry Lim Bon Liong (b. 1952), CEO of the Sterling Paper Group of Companies
- August 4 – Lily Monteverde (b. 1939), film producer and founder of Regal Entertainment
- August 17 – Federico Caballero (b. 1935), Panay-Bukidnon epic chanter and recipient of the National Living Treasures Award (2000).
- August 21 – Howard Dee (b. 1930), peace negotiator, president of Unilab (1965–1972) and ambassador to the Holy See (1986–1990)
- August 24 – Cesar Mangawang (b. 1953), columnist, (Philippine Daily Inquirer)
- August 25 – Glenda Ecleo (b. 1937), governor of Dinagat Islands (2010–2019), representative of the first district of Surigao del Norte (1987–1995 and 2001-2007), and cofounder of the Philippine Benevolent Missionaries Association.

=== September ===
- September 2 – Raul Martirez (b. 1938), bishop of San Jose de Antique (1983–2002)
- September 14 – Brenda Fajardo (b. 1940), visual artist
- September 18 – Temario Rivera (b. 1947), political scientist
- September 27 – Coritha (b. 1951), folk singer

=== October ===
- October 4 – Carlos Brosas (b. 1955), Olympic swimmer (1972) and coach (1988, 2008, and 2012)
- October 12 – Dante Simbulan Sr. (b. 1930), soldier, professor and activist
- October 16 – Danny Mandia (b. 1954), dubbing director
- October 20 – Arturo Bastes (b. 1944), bishop of Romblon (1997–2002) and Sorsogon (2003–2019)

=== November ===
- November 3 – Maita Sanchez (b. 1969), actress and mayor of Pagsanjan, Laguna (2010–2019)
- November 13:
  - Teodoro Buhain Jr. (b. 1939), auxiliary bishop of Manila
  - Ricky Dandan (b. 1961), basketball coach
- November 18 – Mercy Sunot (b. 1976), vocalist (Aegis)
- November 28 – Santanina Rasul (b. 1930), senator (1987–1995)

=== December ===
- December 14 – Lina Sagaral Reyes (b. 1961), journalist and poet
- December 19 – Francisco Nemenzo Jr. (b. 1935), political scientist and President of the University of the Philippines (1999–2005)
- December 24 – Edwin Gastanes (b. 1958), lawyer and secretary-general of the Philippine Football Federation (2013–2023)
- December 27 – Soraya Bedjora Adiong, 80, politician, governor of Lanao del Sur (2016–2019).

== See also ==
=== Country overviews ===
- History of the Philippines
- History of the Philippines (1986–present)
- Outline of the Philippines
- Government of the Philippines
- Politics of the Philippines
- List of years in the Philippines
- Timeline of Philippine history

=== Related timelines for current period ===
- 2024
- 2024 in politics and government
- 2020s
