= PBSP =

PBSP can refer to:

- Pelican Bay State Prison
- Philippine Business for Social Progress
- Proletarian Party of East Bengal
