= Cambodia–Philippines relations =

- Cambodia: Philippines

Diplomatic mission
- Embassy of Cambodia, Manila: Embassy of the Philippines, Phnom Penh

Envoy
- Ambassador Sin Saream: Ambassador Flerida Ann Camille Mayo

Cambodia–Philippines relations refers to the bilateral relations between the Philippines and Cambodia. Relations were formally established in August 1957. The Philippines and Cambodia have maintained cordial ties since the resumption of diplomatic relations in 1995. Cambodia maintains an embassy in Manila and the Philippines also maintains an embassy in Phnom Penh. Both countries are members of Non-Aligned Movement and ASEAN.

== History ==
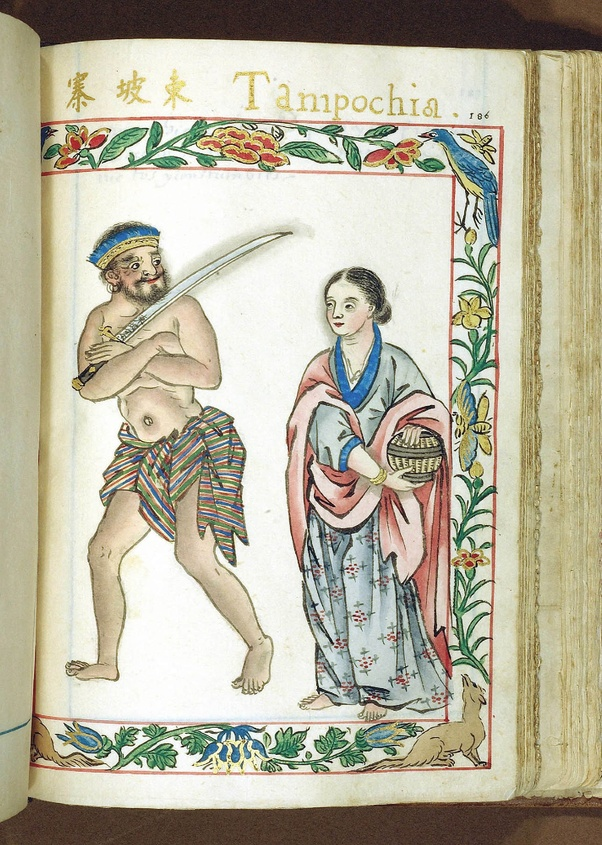
Cambodians in the Philippines, c. 1590 in Boxer Codex

Prior to European colonization, the people of the Cambodian civilization and the port-kingdoms of the Philippines had traded with each other for centuries. The trade was negated after Spain subjugated and took control of the Philippines in the 16th century. Before the Philippines was colonized, Portuguese explorers recorded that some people from Luzon-Philippines called Lucoes participated as soldier-mercenaries in the Burmese-Siamese wars between Myanmar and Thailand, whose territories included parts of modern-day Cambodia.

Having witnessed the Lucoes ' involvement in the Burmese-Siamese Wars, in 1594, Cambodia sent an embassy in Manila, requesting military assistance against the invading Siam (now Thailand) from the rulers of Luzon (which had now changed hands from Native Filipinos to Spaniards). The embassy delegation, headed by Blas Ruiz and Diego Belloso, persuaded the Spanish governor general to the Philippines, Luis Perez Dasmarinas, to send an expedition to Cambodia to aid the king. The expedition consisted of one ship and two junks. It left the Philippines in 1596, carrying artillery and ammunition. After the invasion of Cambodia by Thailand in the Siamese-Cambodian War. The Spanish officers together with their Filipino and Mexican troops plus Portuguese and Japanese allies briefly restored the Christian Cambodian King Satha II who was in exile in Laos, back to the throne. However, after that, a reinvasion by the Thais supported by Chams and Malays killed King Satha II and the royal family was once again exiled.

There is record of commercial contact between Cambodia and Spanish Manila in the seventeenth century. Cambodia was a source of boat building for Manila because of the excellent timber that came from the country's forests. When the French conquered Indochina and released the Kingdom of Cambodia from Thai domination as a protectorate of France, and restored the Cambodian royal family, Spanish-Filipinos were among the troops that were with the French in the conquest of Indochina.

Cambodia's King Norodom I once made a state visit to the Philippines and brought back home with him several Filipinos who have since served in the royal court.

The two countries have multiple agreements on economic and trade relations, agricultural and agribusiness collaboration, and tourism cooperation. Both countries have maintained cordial ties since the resumption of diplomatic relations. The Philippines and Cambodia will sign an agreement to combat transnational crime and terrorism.

The two countries have concluded agreements on economic and trade relations, agricultural and agribusiness collaboration, and tourism cooperation.

In 2012, during the chairmanship of Cambodia in ASEAN, the regional bloc failed to issue a unanimous statement in regards to the South China Sea issue, the first time ASEAN failed to issue such a statement in its history. Cambodia, a close ally of China, was accused by numerous ASEAN nations of siding with China and preventing the group from reaching an agreement. Cambodia's international image was greatly damaged by its pro-Chinese position. To ensure diplomatic channels remain open, both ambassadors of the Philippines and Cambodia issued separate statements describing their bilateral relations as still diplomatically strong. Cambodia afterwards recalled its previous ambassador to the Philippines, after the ambassador verbally attacked the Philippines and Vietnam while praised China. In 2016, Cambodia again stopped an ASEAN unified stance on the South China Sea issue, and negated any mention of the South China Sea Arbitration case won by the Philippines against China. Cambodia's stance on the issue may impact its own territorial disputes with Thailand since the significance of the Philippines' case against China is identical to the dispute of Cambodia with Thailand. By ruling in favor of China, Cambodia signaled that Thailand's occupation on its territories is also just.

== Gallery ==
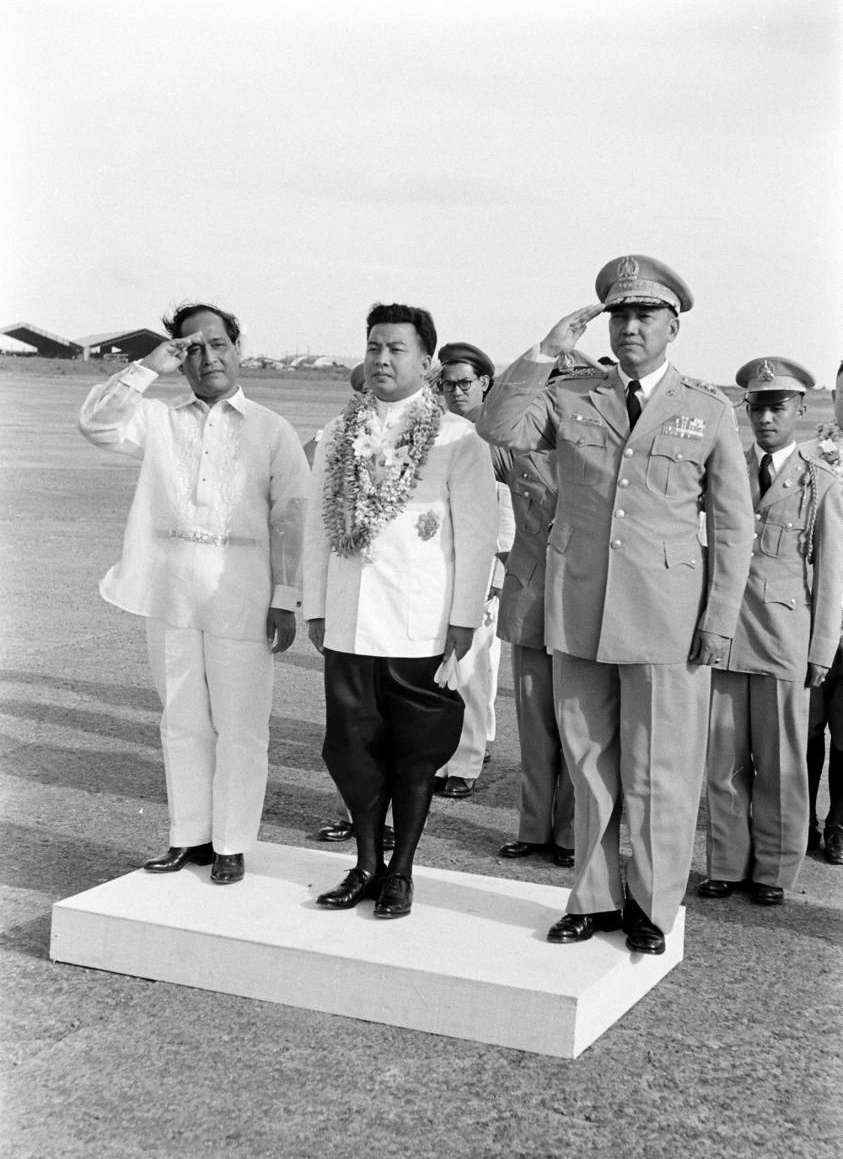
Prince Norodom Sihanouk with Vice President Carlos P. Garcia in Manila, 30 January 1956.

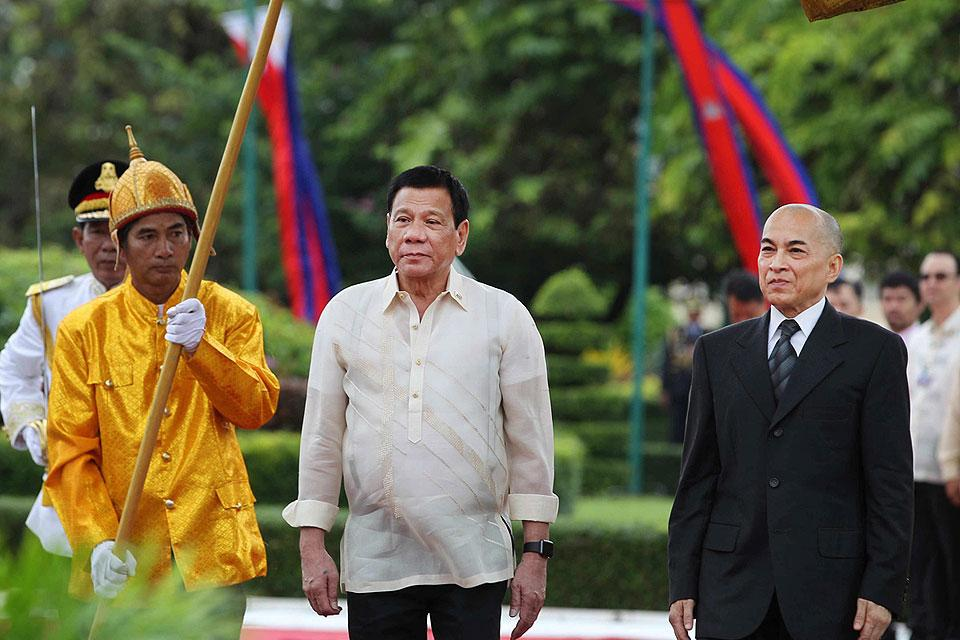
President Rodrigo Duterte with King Norodom Sihamoni at the Royal Palace, Phnom Penh on 14 December 2016.

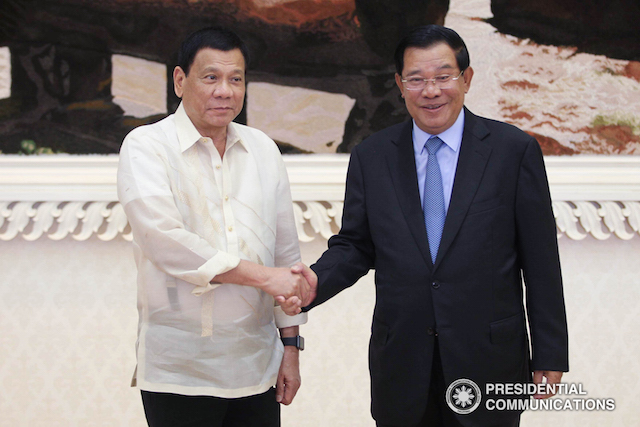
President Rodrigo Duterte shaking hands with Prime Minister Hun Sen at the Peace Palace, Phnom Penh on 14 December 2016.

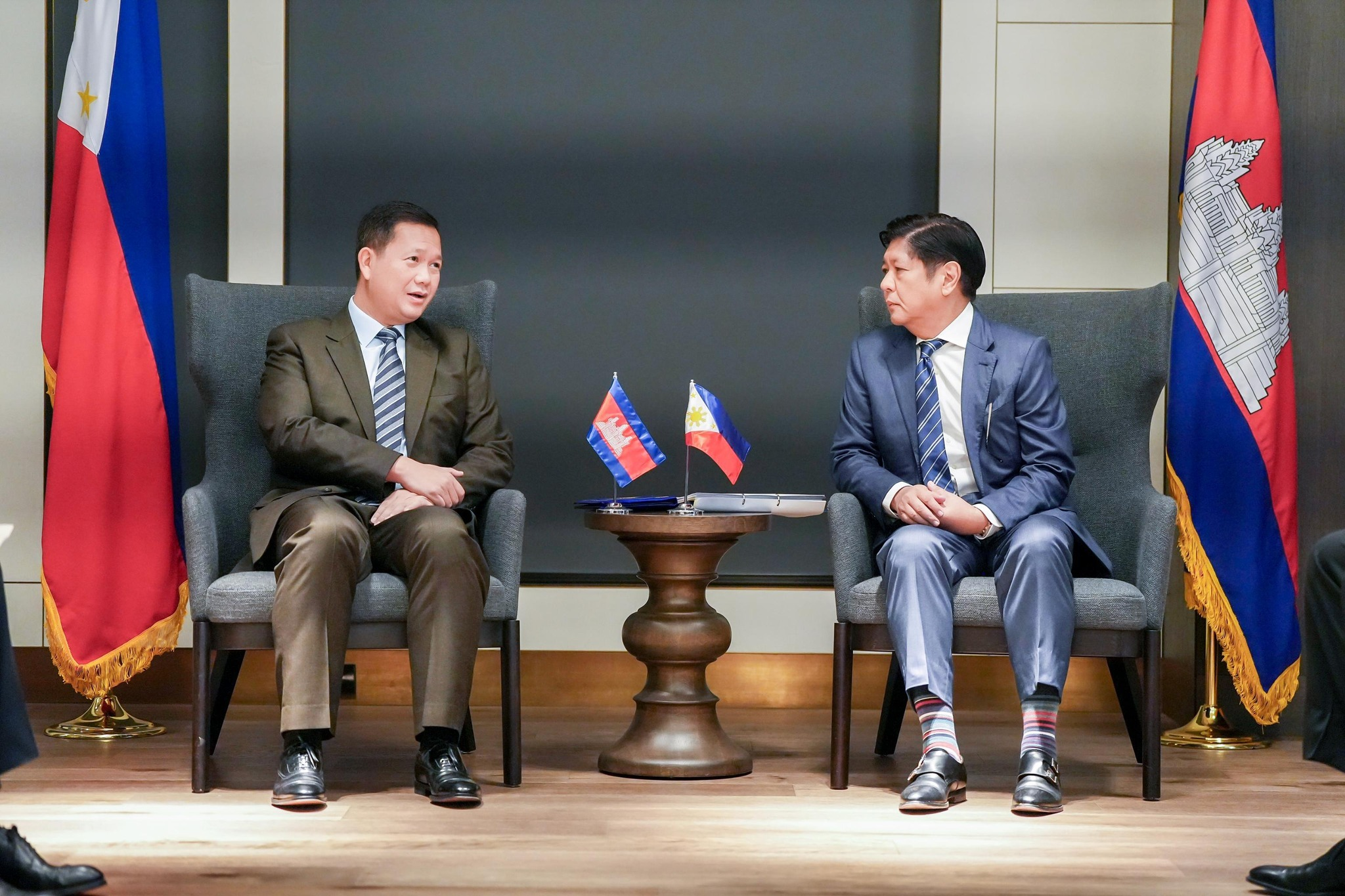
Prime Minister Hun Manet and President Bongbong Marcos on 4 March 2024.

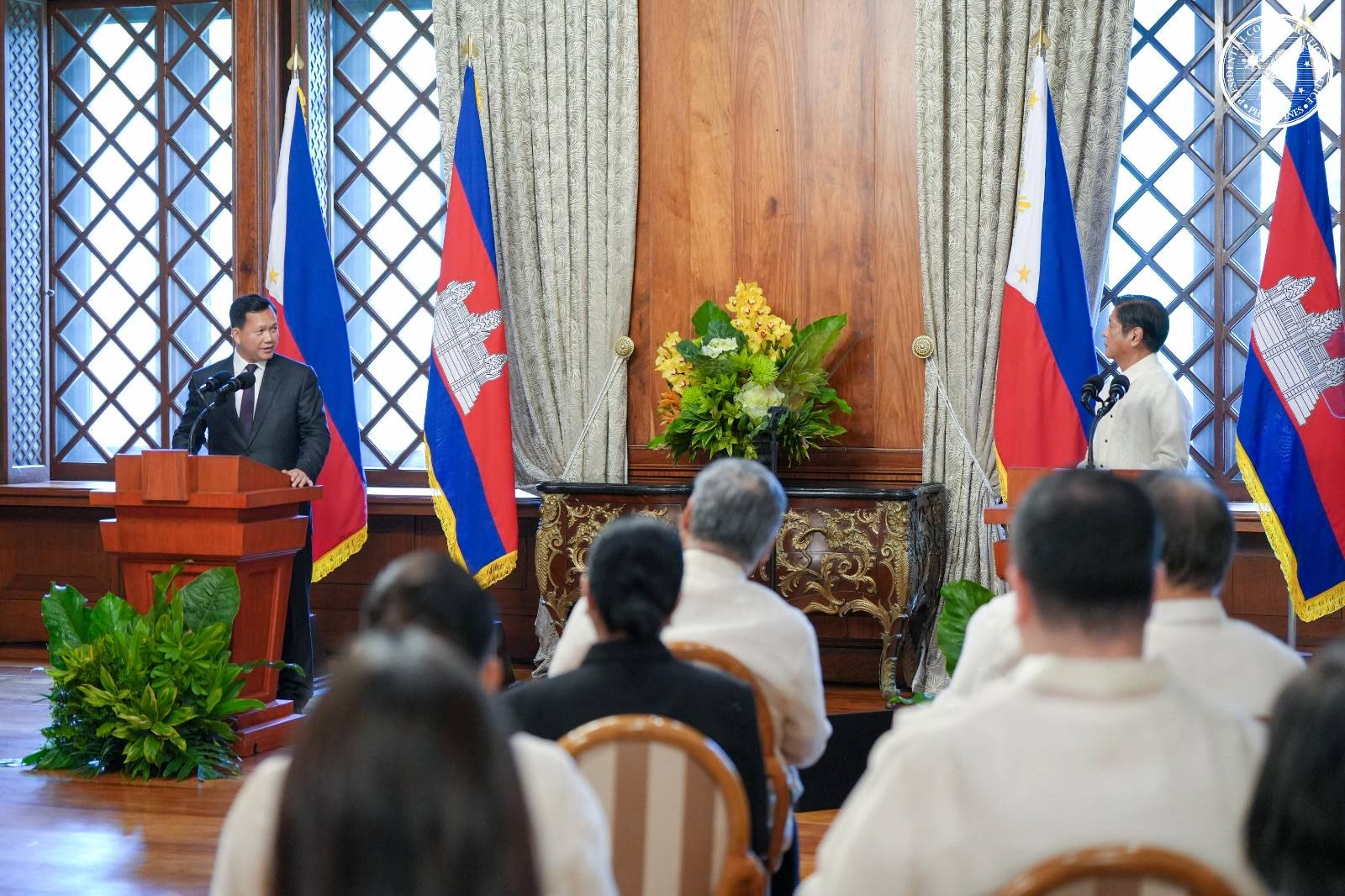
Prime Minister Hun Manet and President Bongbong Marcos at Malacañang Palace, Manila on 11 February 2025.
