= 2023–2024 Bangsamoro measles outbreak =

Disease outbreak in the Philippines

- Disease: Measles
- First outbreak: October 9, 2023, in Lanao del Sur
- Date: 2023 – April 23/2024
- Confirmed cases: 2,064 (April 17, 2024)
- Deaths: 14 (April 17, 2024)
- Vaccinations: 1,034,841 (April 23, 2024)

The 2023–2024 Bangsamoro measles outbreak is an outbreak of measles affecting the autonomous region of Bangsamoro in the Philippines since 2023. An outbreak was first declared in Lanao del Sur on October 9, 2023, with a region-wide outbreak later declared on March 21, 2024.

== Outbreak ==
=== Outbreak in Lanao del Sur ===
Since April 29, 2023, there are documented cases of people experiencing measles symptoms Lanao del Sur. This was observed in the population of Marawi on June 6, 2023, primarily affecting people below ten years old. An increase of trend of measles cases in different provinces of Bangsamoro was observed from August 6 to September 3, 2023, which led to the declaration of a measles outbreak on October 9, 2023, in Lanao del Sur and Marawi on October 9, 2023.

=== Regional outbreak ===
The measles outbreak was declared in the Bangsamoro region by the local Ministry of Health (MOH) on March 21, 2024. The declaration came after 592 cases and 3 deaths were record in the Bangsamoro since January 1 of that year. Majority of the cases were in Lanao del Sur with 220 people infected.

The national Department of Health expressed confidence that no outbreak will happen in other regions of the Philippines. The national health department says that it was only the Bangsamoro region which has not attained herd immunity against measles and rubella with 50 percent coverage – the reason which it states that the outbreak has occurred in the region.

By April 17, 2024, 787 cases has been recorded in the Bangsamoro region or 48 percent of the 1,627 cases recorded nationwide for 2024 alone. On the same date, the National Disaster Risk Reduction and Management Council recorded 2,064 cases and 14 deaths since 2023 in the Bangsamoro region.

By April 23, 2024, 905 cases and 4 deaths been recorded in the Bangsamoro for the year 2024 alone.

== Response ==
The Bangsamoro health ministry in cooperation of the national Department of Health launched a free measles vaccination drive for people in the region which began on April 1, 2024. By April 17, 2024, 981,805 individuals aged six to ten years old has been vaccinated under the program.

The Bangsamoro government also cooperated with the Regional Darul Ifta' of Bangsamoro which insisted through a fatwa that measles vaccines are halal to encourage people to get vaccinated in the Muslim-majority region.

== Cases ==
Confirmed cases as per the National Disaster Risk Reduction and Management Council (April 17, 2024)
Province	Cases	Deaths
Lanao del Sur	1,265	11
Maguindanao del Norte and Maguindanao del Sur (Note: Listed as the defunct Maguindanao province in the report)	427	3
Sulu	302	0
Tawi-Tawi	25	0
Cotabato City (Note: Independent city)	23	0
Basilan	14	0
Special Geographic Area (Note: Not a province, city or municipality)	8	0
Total (regionwide)	2,064	14
