= 2024 Manila fires =

November 2024 Manila fire
- Date: 24 November 2024; 8:00am; (PHT)
- Location: Downtown Manila

Statistics
- Land use: Residental urban area

Impacts
- Deaths: None
- Injuries: None
- Structures lost: 1,000 homes

Ignition
- Cause: Unknown

On November 24, 2024, strong fires hit downtown Manila, Philippines. 8,000 individuals were deemed homeless, including around 2,000 families. The Manila Fire District reported that approximately 1,000 houses were burned.

== Background ==
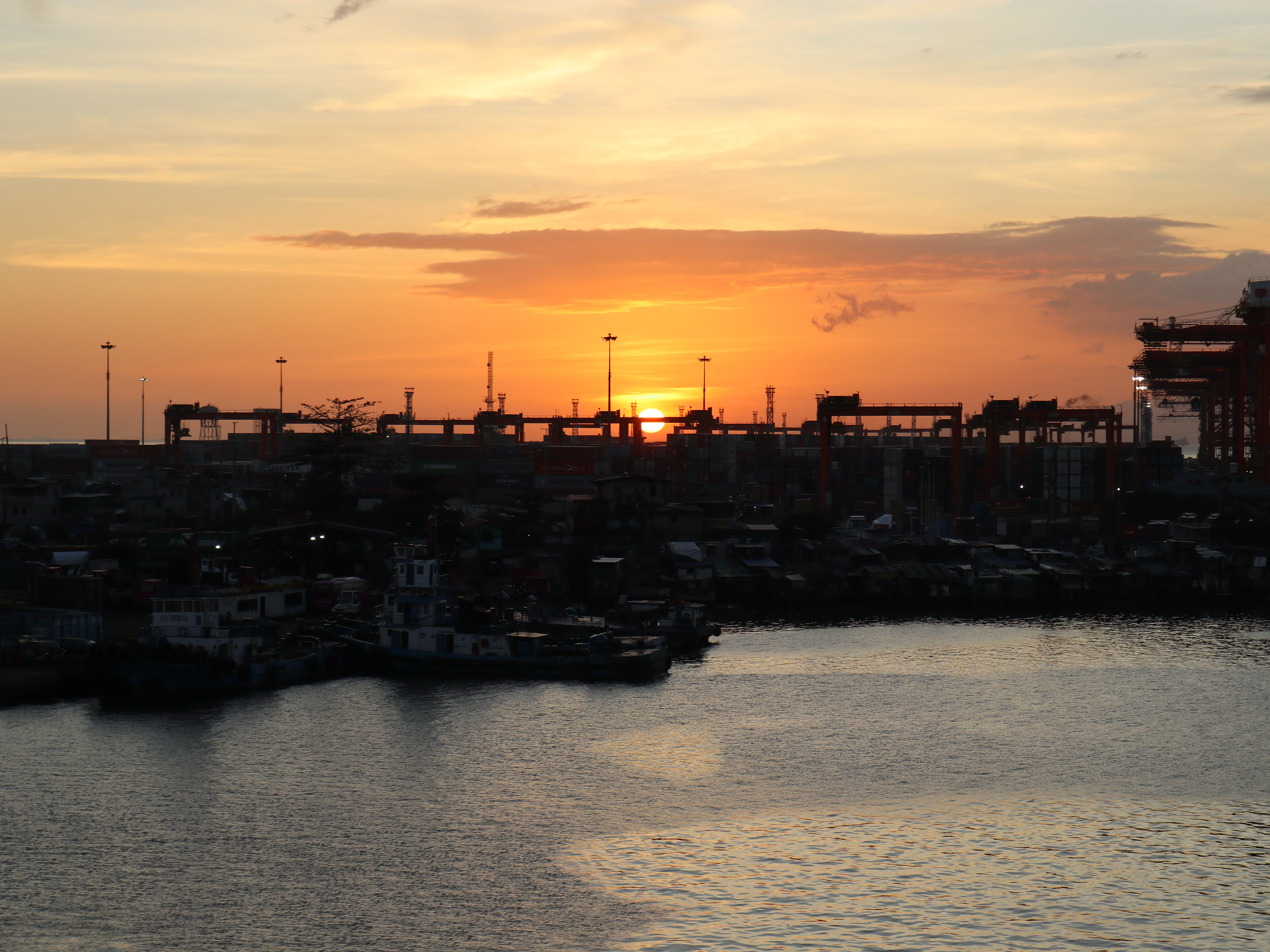
The barangay of Isla Puting Bato; the main barangay affected by this incident.

Isla Puting Bato, a barangay in Manila, with most of the houses in a shabby manner, classifying the barangay as a slum.

== Fire ==
On the second floor in one home in Isla Puting Bato, a fire started in approximately 8:00 a.m., quickly spreading to other homes. After an eight-hour battle, firefighters ended the fire, at 4:07 p.m. No casualties were reported, though 1,000 homes, housing about 2,000 families and 8,000 individuals were destroyed.

== Operations and aftermath ==
A resident in the area said that she "lost everything", another resident said, "everything was gone" and added, "We don't know how we can eat. We are in a very bad situation, and it's almost Christmas." After a meeting by the Manila City Council, where 21 out of the 38 councilors were present, placed a state of calamity over districts 1 and 4 of Sampaloc, Manila. Isla Puting Bato was also covered in the alert. The blaze damaged a large part of the city's economy. After the declaration, a humanitarian response was requested. 36 fire trucks and four fire boats were deployed by the national fire department.
