= Lima Technology Center =

Mixed-use development in Batangas, Philippines

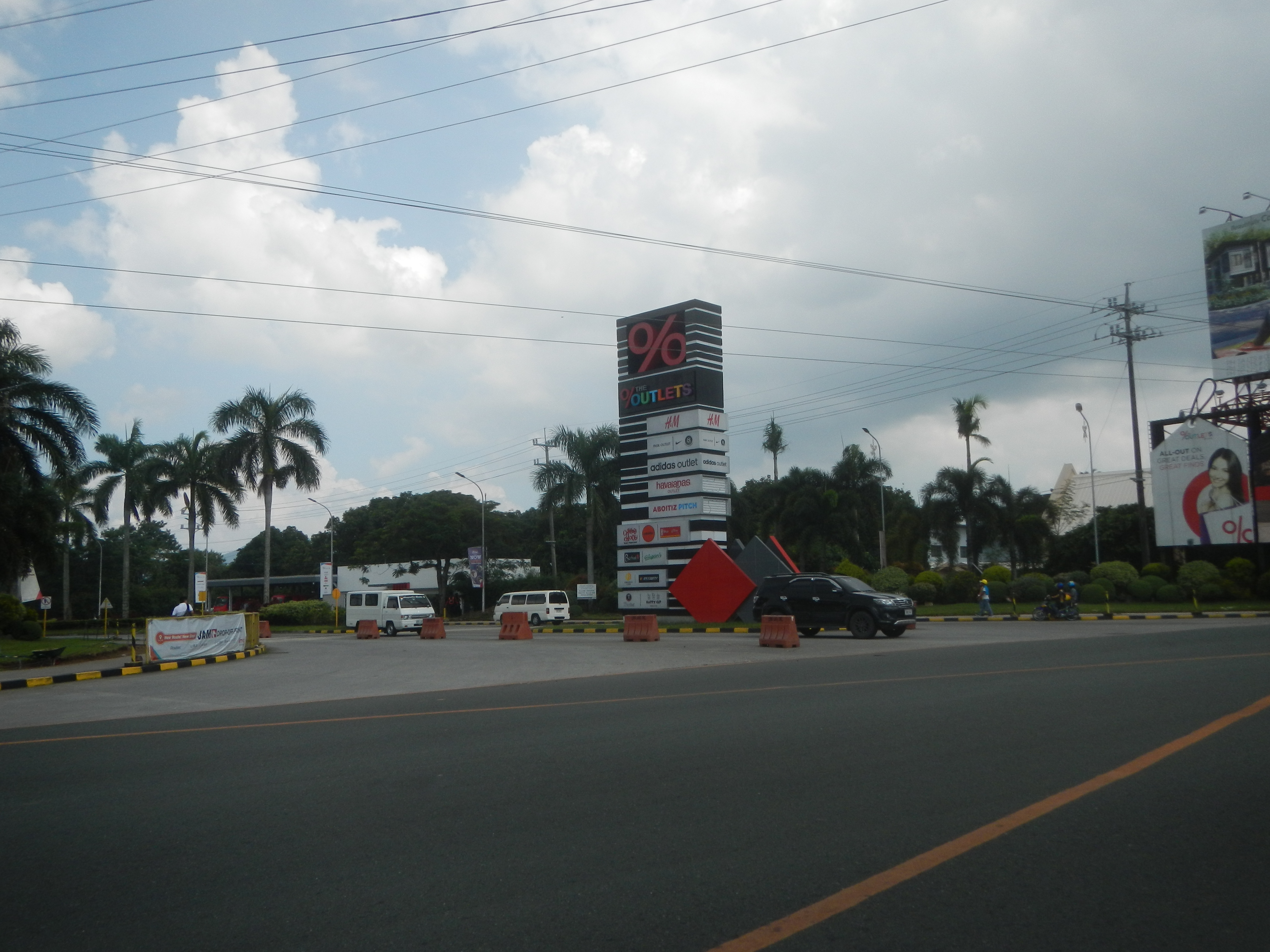
- The Outlets at Lipa

Project
- Developer: Aboitiz Group
- Operator: Lima Land
- Owner: Lima Land
- Website: www.aboitizeconomicestates.com/economic-estates/lima-estate

Location
- Location in Luzon Location in the Philippines
- Coordinates: 14°00′51.0″N 121°10′29.8″E
- Country: Philippines
- Location: Lipa and Malvar, Batangas, Philippines

Area
  - Total: 794 ha (1,960 acres)

The Lima Technology Center (stylized as LIMA Technology Center) is a mixed-use development spanning portions of Lipa and Malvar in Batangas, Philippines. It is recognized as a special economic zone.

== History ==
The Lima Technology Center is a development by Lima Land, Inc. (LLI), a 60-40 joint venture of local firm Alsons Land Inc. and Japanese company Marubeni The Alcantara Group originally had the majority stakes in Alsons Land. "Lima" in its name was derived from the first syllables of Lipa and Malvar, the location of the center.

The Aboitiz Group through its subsidiary Aboitiz Land started acquiring LLI in the early 2010s. In 2013, it bought out the Alcantara Group's majority stakes in LLI. At that time the area covers around 200 ha (490 acres). The following year, it bought the remaining stakes owned by Marubeni making Aboitiz the full owner of LLI.

Under the Aboitiz Group, the Lima Technology Center was further expanded, covering an area of more than 700 ha (1,700 acres) by 2020. In 2019, Aboitiz launched the first residential development within the Lima Technology Center, "The Villages at Lipa". By 2021, the group has rebranded the commercial zone of the development as a central business district.

== Economy ==
The Lima Technology Center is primarily an industrial park and is a registered special economic zone with the Philippine Economic Zone Authority. After the Aboitiz Group acquired the development in the 2010s, the area became a mixed-used development. As of 2021 it covers an area of 794 ha (1,960 acres). The Aboitiz Group manages the development as one of its Aboitiz Integrated Economic Centers.

The Lima Technology Center contains the Lima Estate. The Lima Technology Center has a commercial area which Aboitiz considers as a central business district (CBD). The CBD covering an area of around 30 ha (74 acres), hosts The Outlets at Lipa, Lima Exchange, Lima Park Hotel, as well as the Lima Transport Hub

As of 2020, the Lima Technology Center has 124 locators, consisting of both local and foreign firms, employing around 55,000 workers.

== Sports ==
The Lima Technology Center hosts the Aboitiz Pitch, a football venue which has held matches of the Philippines Football League.
