= Josefina Constantino =

Filipino essayist, literary critic and poet (1920–2024)

Personal life
- Born: Josefina D. Constantino; 28 March 1920
- Died: 19 July 2024 (aged 104)
- Other names: Sister Teresa Joseph Patrick of Jesus and Mary

Religious life
- Religion: Catholic Church
- Order: Carmelites

Josefina D. Constantino (28 March 1920 – 19 July 2024) was a Filipino essayist, literary critic and poet. A prominent faculty member of the University of the Philippines, she later took vows as a member of Carmelite order in 1979. Latterly a cloistered nun, she was known as Sister Teresa Joseph Patrick of Jesus and Mary.

== Biography ==
=== Early life and education ===
Constantino was born on 28 March 1920. She earned her undergraduate degree at the University of the Philippines, and her Masters in English and comparative literature at Columbia University. She likewise enrolled in special studies at the University of Michigan and University of Edinburgh. She joined the faculty of the College of Arts and Letters of the University of the Philippines, where she taught humanities and contemporary literature for several years. She also held a faculty fellowship at the Massachusetts Institute of Technology.

=== Work ===
Constantino became known for her published critical literary reviews of such authors as Nick Joaquin. She was likewise a popular professor at the University of the Philippines lauded for her patience and erudition.

In the 1970s, she joined the Development Bank of the Philippines as a special assistant. She resigned her government position and from the University of the Philippines faculty upon joining the Discalced Carmelites.

=== Later life and death ===
Constantino lived at the Discalced Carmelite convent in New Manila, Quezon City. She turned 100 in March 2020, and died on 19 July 2024, at the age of 104.

== Controversies ==
=== Trial of Ricardo Pascual ===
In 1961, having resigned her faculty position a year prior, Constantino served as a "feature witness" in the trial of former colleague University of the Philippines philosophy professor Ricardo Pascual. Pascual, then Dean of the Graduate School of Arts and Sciences, was brought before the House Committee on Anti-Filipino Activities (CAFA) under charges of communist affiliation.

Following public backlash against the anomalous line of questioning taken by prosecutors, and an overall lack of evidence suggesting communist affiliation, the probe was ultimately terminated and Pascual exonerated.
