= Cesar Mangawang =

Filipino journalist (1953–2024)

- Born: January 4, 1953; Sampaloc, Manila, Philippines
- Died: August 24, 2024 (aged 71)
- Education: Colegio de San Juan de Letran
- Occupation: Journalist

Cesar Dulay Mangawang (January 4, 1953 – August 24, 2024) was a Filipino journalist. He headed the research department of the Philippine Daily Inquirer in 1986 and became an editor before retiring from the newspaper 30 years later.

== Early life ==
Mangawang was a dean’s lister at Colegio de San Juan de Letran and editor of The Lance student publication.

Mangawang first worked as a press officer for the then Mayor Nemesio Yabut of Makati and as a project officer at the Asian Institute of Journalism and Communication.

== Death ==
Mangawang succumbed to heart failure on August 24, 2024, according to Gigi, his younger sister. His wake was at the Most Holy Trinity Mortuary on Sobriedad Street, Sampaloc, Manila where he was born and raised by his parents from La Union. He was cremated on August 30, 2024.
