= Pride PH Festival =

LGBTQ event in Quezon City, Philippines

- Genre: Pride parade and festival
- Frequency: Every June
- Locations: Quezon City, Philippines
- Inaugurated: 2022
- Organizer: Pride PH; Quezon City LGU
- 2026 Pride PH Festival

Pride PH Festival is a pride parade and festival event in Quezon City, Philippines.

== History ==
Pride PH Festival is organized by Pride PH, a network of LGBTQ organizations, in partnership with the local government of Quezon City (QC). During its launching, an estimate of 5,000 participants marched from the North Avenue gate of the Quezon Memorial Circle. The whole event was attended by 25,000 people.

Like the first Pride PH Festival, the 2nd edition was once again held in Quezon City. In the 2023 Pride PH Festival, the local government unit of QC launched the Right to Care card, a healthcare proxy card for LGBTQ couples. The event was dubbed as the "Largest Pride March in Southeast Asia" after setting an attendance record of 110,752.

The third edition in 2024, was attended by 200,000 people. The concert in the evening was paused midway at 6:30 PM (PHT) due to inclement weather, and was later cancelled, with G22, Bini and Vice Ganda supposed to perform.

== Editions ==
Year	Date	Theme	Estimated attendance	Notes
2022	June 25	Alab For Love	25,000	
2023	June 24	Love, Laban: A Celebration of the Fight for Love in All Forms and Ways	110,752	
2024	June 22	LoveLaban2Everyone	200,000	
