= Manibela =

Philippine public transport organization

- Samahang Manibela Mananakay at Nagkaisang Terminal ng Transportasyon
- Abbreviation: SMMITT
- Formation: 2018; 8 years ago
- Members: 50,000 (2022)
- Chairman: Mar Valbuena

The Samahang Manibela, Mananakay at Nagkaisang Terminal ng Transportasyon (Note: Previously known as Samahan ng Mga Malls Integrated Transport Terminal Federation) (SMMITT; lit. 'Federation of Drivers, Commuters, and United Transportation Terminals'), simply known as Manibela (lit. 'steering wheel') is a public transport organization in the Philippines. It claims to have 50,000 drivers and operators as members as of March 2022.

The group attempted to register as a partylist for the 2019 House of Representatives election, but was denied by the Commission on Elections (COMELEC).

Manibela has opposed the implementation of phaseout for traditional jeepneys under the Philippine government's Public Utility Vehicle Modernization Program. They initiated a nationwide transport strike in 2023 against the policy.

For the 2022 Philippine presidential election, they endorsed the campaign of Leni Robredo. They made a failed bid to participate in the 2022 House of Representatives election and to win a seat in the legislature as a partylist organization. Their candidacy failed to receive accreditation from the Commission on Elections.

Manibela joined PISTON in the 2024 Labor Day protest against the government’s Jeepney modernization program. Its chairman Mario "Mar" Valbuena Jr. filed his candidacy for senator in the 2025 election.

== Legal issue ==
Pasig City Regional Trial Court Branch 158, Presiding Judge Manuel Gerard Tomacruz issued an arrest warrant dated April 23, 2024, against chairman Mar Valbuena with recommended bail of P10,000 each for 2 counts of cyber libel emanating Jaime Bautista's sworn complaint. Valbuena accused Bautista of corruption, which Bautista denied. The court ruling also dismissed a complaint of grave threats filed against Valbuena.
