= Philippine Business for Social Progress =

Philippine Business for Social Progress (PBSP) is the largest corporate-led social development foundation in the Philippines. Founded in 1970, PBSP was the first in Asia to lead the promotion and practice of corporate social responsibility (CSR). Comprising more than 260 businesses, PBSP operates nationwide programs in education, health, livelihood and the environment. PBSP had benefited 4.5 million Filipinos, and assisted 6,200 development projects through PHP 7 billion in grants and loans.

== Legacy ==
Founded in 1970, PBSP was the first in Asia to advocate and practice corporate social responsibility (CSR). PBSP was modeled after the Venezuelan Dividendo Voluntario para la Comunidad, where businesses allocate a certain percentage of their profits to development projects. PBSP's projects have delivered assistance to landless farmers, fishermen, rural workers, urban poor and indigenous cultural communities in the Philippines.

== History ==
PBSP was established in 1970 when 50 Filipino businessmen set aside 1% of their companies’ net income before taxes for poverty reduction programs.

PBSP first started implementing development projects in 15 provinces in the 1980s. The PBSP then developed in the 1990s a program to improve the harvests of rice farmers. In the 2000s, PBSP implemented projects for health and education in Mindanao, that are in line with the United Nations Millennium Development Goals (MDGs).
