= 2023 in the Philippines =

- Decades: 2000s; 2010s; 2020s
- See also: List of years in the Philippines; films; music; television; sports

2023 in the Philippines details notable events that occurred in the Philippines in 2023.

On July 21, 2023, President Bongbong Marcos announced that the government will formally lift the COVID-19 state of public health emergency, marking the end of the three years of the pandemic. The emergency was officially lifted the following day.

== Incumbents ==
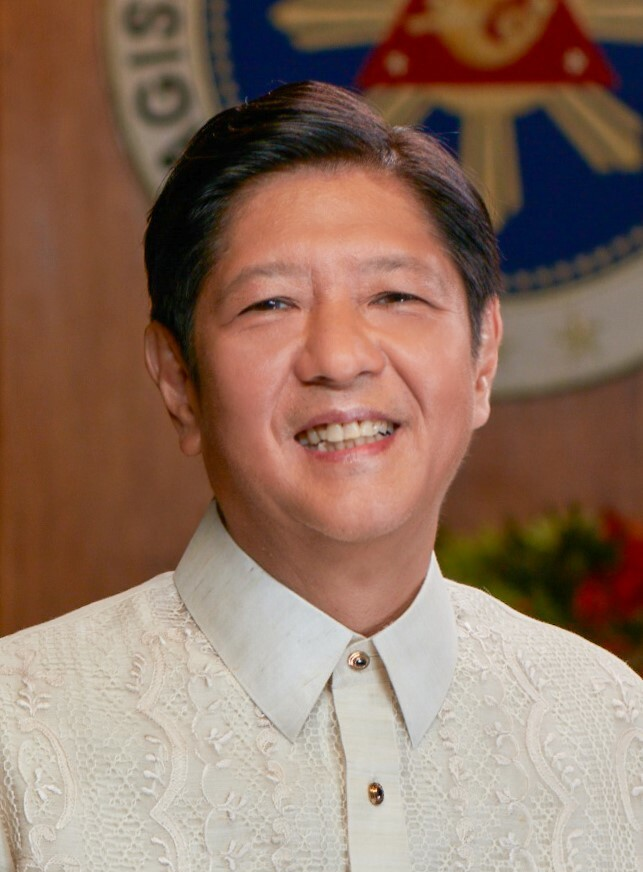
Ferdinand R. Marcos Jr.

Sara Z. Duterte

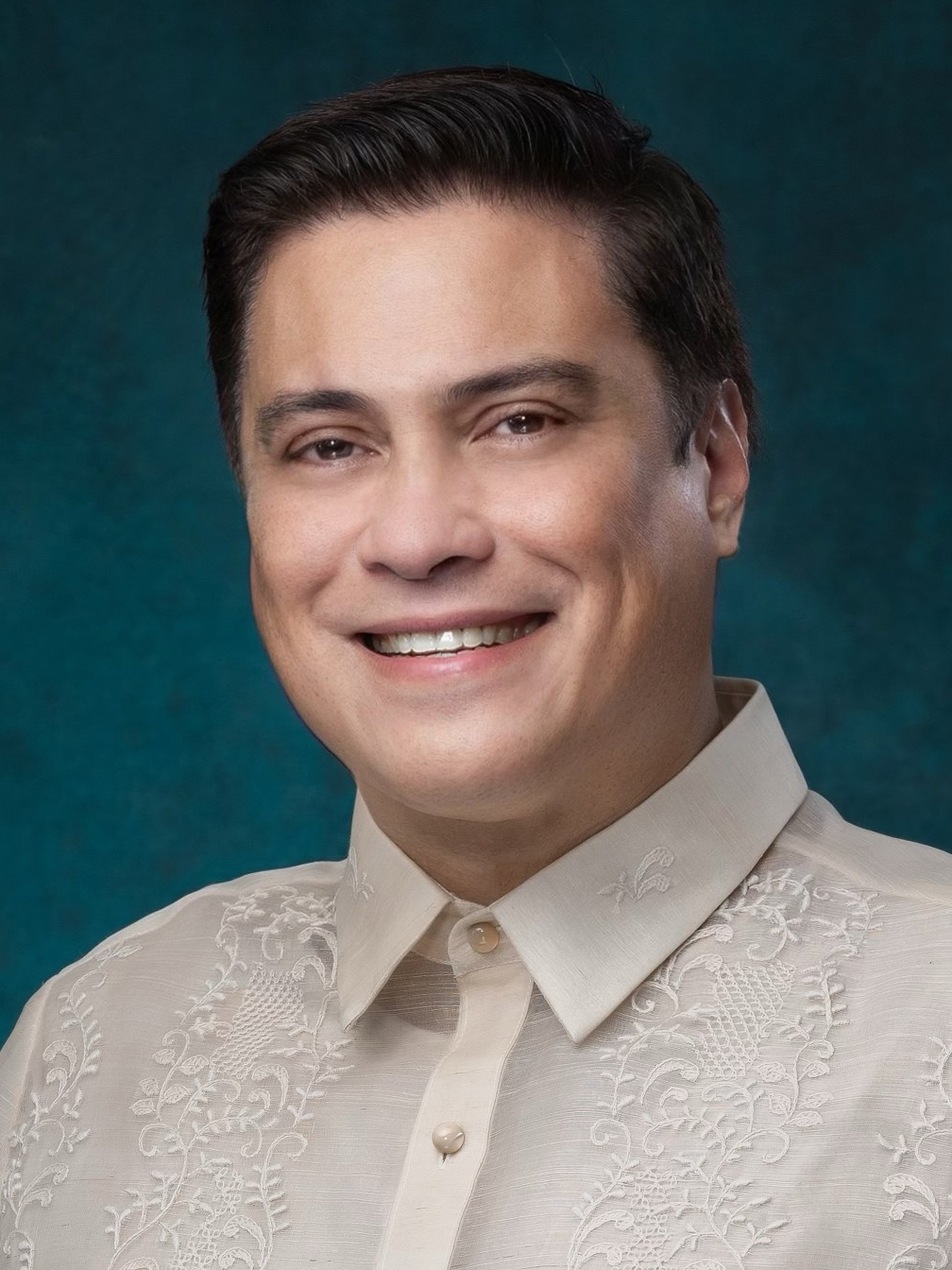
Juan Miguel F. Zubiri

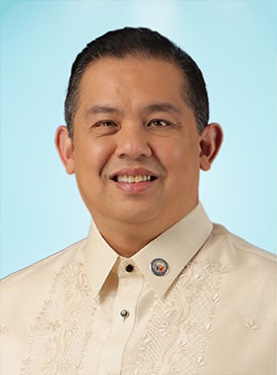
Ferdinand Martin G. Romualdez Sr.

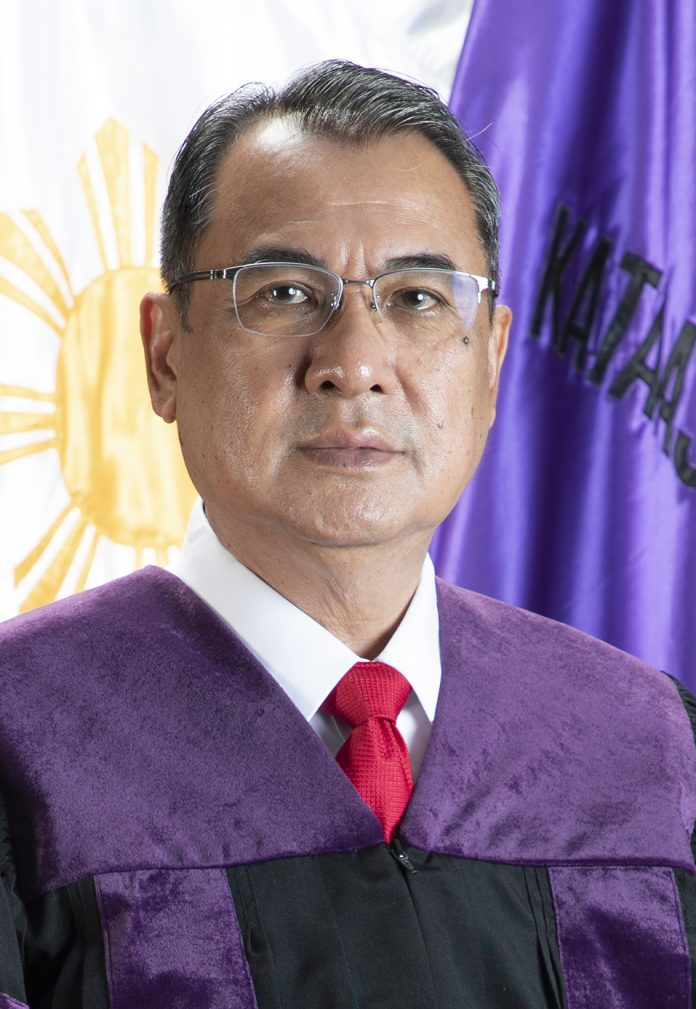
Alexander G. Gesmundo

- President: Bongbong Marcos (PFP)
- Vice President: Sara Duterte (HNP)
- Congress (19th):
  - Senate President: Migz Zubiri (Independent)
  - House Speaker: Martin Romualdez (Lakas-CMD)
- Chief Justice: Alexander Gesmundo

== Ongoing events ==
- COVID-19 pandemic (until July 22)
- Philippine sugar crisis

== Events ==
=== January ===
- January 1 – 2023 Philippine airspace closure: The Civil Aviation Authority of the Philippines closes the country's airspace for nearly six hours due to a power outage in its air traffic management center that affected its communication systems, disrupting more than 280 commercial flights and more than 56,000 passengers.
- January 4 – The Ateneo de Manila University debate team wins the 2023 World Universities Debating Championship, the world's largest international debating tournament, held at the King Juan Carlos University in Madrid, Spain. It is the first time that a Philippine university has won the title.
- January 10 – Territorial disputes in the South China Sea: The Supreme Court nullifies the Joint Marine Seismic Undertaking agreement between the Philippine National Oil Company, the China National Offshore Oil Corporation, and Petrovietnam to conduct joint oil and gas exploration activities within the Philippine exclusive economic zone in the South China Sea since 2005, citing the unconstitutionality of permitting foreign corporations and governments to exploit the country's natural resources. The decision is affirmed in July.
- January 13 – Zootaxa reveals in a publication the discovery of two new species of hedgehog (Podogymnura) in the mountains of Mindanao.
- January 18 – The Court of Tax Appeals acquits online news website Rappler as well as its founder, Maria Ressa, in a tax evasion case filed against them by the Duterte administration in 2018.
- January 24:
  - The Supreme Court en banc votes, 13–1, to declare the TRAIN Law (Republic Act No. 10963) as constitutional, with two petitions against the law dismissed.
  - A Cessna 206, bound for Maconacon, Isabela from Cauayan, is reported missing. The plane would be found on March 9 in Divilacan, with all six people aboard confirmed dead.
- January 25 – A Philippine Air Force SF.260 training flight from Sangley Point Airport in Cavite City, crashes on a paddy field in Pilar, Bataan, killing two people on board.
- January 30 – The Anti-Terrorism Council announces its resolutions, dated December 7, 2022, designating community doctor Natividad Castro, an alleged active member of the Communist Party of the Philippines–New People's Army–National Democratic Front, and the Al Khobar Group in Mindanao, allegedly linked to the Dawlah Islamiyah, as terrorists.

=== February ===
- February 1 – Philippines–United States relations: The Philippines permits the United States Armed Forces access to an additional four military bases, thereby expediting the full implementation of the Enhanced Defense Cooperation Agreement.
- February 6 – Second Thomas Shoal laser incident: A China Coast Guard vessel allegedly uses a laser weapon on a Philippine Coast Guard ship near the Second Thomas Shoal in the South China Sea leading to the Philippines filing a diplomatic protest.
- February 8 – The Supreme Court publicizes a January 16 decision dismissing graft charges filed in 1990 against Chief Presidential Legal Counsel and former senate president Juan Ponce Enrile and eight other respondents in relation to the Coco Levy Fund scam, citing violation of the right to speedy trial as well as the deaths of four of those involved.
- February 11 – Camp Evangelista shooting: Four soldiers are killed and another is critically injured by a fellow soldier during a mass shooting at a barracks in Cagayan de Oro. The perpetrator is shot dead.
- February 15 – The Supreme Court publicizes a January 17 decision affirming the dismissal in 2012 by the Ombudsman of graft complaints filed against two former members of President Ferdinand Marcos' cabinet, Roberto Ongpin and Jose Aspiras, and six other individuals in connection with the granting of loans in 1980 involving the Philippine National Bank.
- February 17 – Maguing ambush: Four people are killed and two others are injured, including Lanao del Sur governor Mamintal Alonto Adiong Jr., when their convoy is ambushed in Maguing, Lanao del Sur, by unknown gunmen.
- February 18 – A Cessna 340 aircraft operated by Energy Development Corporation crashes on Mayon Volcano, Albay, upon taking off from Bicol International Airport in Daraga for Manila, killing all four people on board, all of whom were employees of the corporation, including two Australian technical consultants.
- February 24 – The Philippine Independent Church ordains Wylard Ledama to the diaconate as the first trans woman clergy in the country.
- February 25 – A special election is held to fill the vacant seat in Cavite's 7th congressional district in the House of Representatives. Jesus Crispin Remulla, the previous officeholder, vacated the seat to serve as the Secretary of Justice. His son, Crispin Diego Remulla, is elected to the seat.
- February 28 – Oil tanker MT Princess Empress sinks off Naujan, Oriental Mindoro, resulting in the spillage of its diesel fuel and almost a million-liter industrial cargo fuel. The oil spill affects Oriental Mindoro, southern Occidental Mindoro, northern Palawan, Caluya in Antique, parts of Batangas (Verde Island, Tingloy, and San Juan) and southern Quezon; combined damages to environment and livelihood reaches ₱10.8-billion.

=== March ===
- March 4 – Negros Oriental governor Roel Degamo, along with nine others, was murdered in his home in Pamplona.
- March 6–7 – 2023 transport strike in the Philippines: Operators of traditional public jeepneys and minivans hold a strike in various cities to protest against the Public Utility Vehicle Modernization Program. Initially planned for a week, the strike ended earlier following a meeting between labor union leaders and Office of the President officials.
- March 8 – The United Nations' committee on women's rights releases its decision, finding that the country breached its obligations under the Convention on the Elimination of All Forms of Discrimination Against Women and violated the rights of victims of sexual abuse by the Japanese Army in World War II, and recommending the government's full reparation for the complainants.
- March 13:
  - The Navotas Regional Trial Court (RTC), in a publicized decision, convicts dismissed policeman Jefrey Perez of murder, sentencing him to reclusión perpetua, in the second conviction in relation to the deaths of two teenagers in 2017 during the country's drug war.
  - The Supreme Court, in a publicized February 8 ruling, reverses two rulings by the Court of Appeals which had ordered re-filing of charges of crimes against chastity against actor Vhong Navarro, eventually dismissing them citing lack of probable cause.
- March 22 – The House of Representatives unanimously issues a 60-day suspension to Negros Oriental's 3rd district representative Arnolfo Teves Jr. due to his prolonged travel outside the Philippines with an expired travel clearance, constituting "disorderly behavior" under Section 142(a) of the House code of conduct for incumbent representatives. On May 31, another 60-day suspension is given to Teves due to his continued unauthorized absences.
- March 25 – The Antipolo Cathedral gains status as an international shrine in accordance with a papal decree received on March 13. The cathedral in Antipolo, Rizal, becomes the eleventh international shrine in the world, the third in Asia, and the first in the Philippines.
- March 29 – Passenger ferry MV Lady Mary Joy 3 catches fire near Baluk-Baluk Island, Hadji Muhtamad, Basilan while on its way to Jolo, Sulu; thirty-three die.

=== April ===
- April 3 – Makati–Taguig boundary dispute: The Supreme Court releases an earlier resolution ruling with finality that Fort Bonifacio belongs to Taguig, following a territorial dispute with Makati over the barangay.
- April 18 – The Supreme Court, issuing a Writ of Kalikasan, orders the prevention of the commercial release of genetically modified rice and eggplant products.
- April 19 – The Court of Appeals releases a February 6 decision upholding the 2019 conviction of former bank manager Maia Santos-Deguito for money laundering regarding the 2016 Bangladesh Bank robbery.
- April 20 – The government of Occidental Mindoro declares a province-wide state of calamity due to power outages that have been occurring for more than a month.
- April 21 – SS Montevideo Maru, a Japanese merchant ship torpedoed during World War II in the deadliest incident in Australia's maritime history, is found at the South China Sea, northwest of Luzon.

=== May ===
- May 12 – The Muntinlupa Regional Trial Court (RTC) acquits former Senator Leila de Lima in connection with the second of three drug cases against her.
- May 17 – President Marcos signs Republic Act No. 11939, amending RA No. 11709 which fixed the term of office of key officers in the Armed Forces of the Philippines, and providing also certain rules for compulsory retirement for the personnel.
- May 19 – Kuwait–Philippines relations: The Ministry of Interior of Kuwait suspends the issuance of travel and work visas to Filipinos for allegedly breaching a bilateral labor agreement signed in 2018.
- May 21 – The Manila Central Post Office, designated as an "important cultural property" of the country by the National Commission for Culture and the Arts, is destroyed by a fire.
- May 22:
  - The Sandiganbayan dismisses 16 counts of graft against pork barrel scam mastermind Janet Lim-Napoles, acquitting her in relation to the scam involving Senator Bong Revilla. It also reports its May 10 decision convicting her and four other individuals of charges of graft and malversation in connection with the use of pork barrel of the late former Davao del Sur representative Douglas Cagas, whose case against him has been dismissed along with eight others.
  - The Manila Metropolitan Trial Court Branch 17 convicts Peter Joemel "Bikoy" Advincula for perjury over his allegations against Free Legal Assistance Group lawyers Chel Diokno, Erin Tañada, and Theodore Te.

=== June ===
- June 6 – The Angeles City RTC convicts a police personnel and a former National Bureau of Investigation agent in connection with the 2016 death of South Korean businessman Jee Ick Joo, sentencing each of them up to 65 years in prison; but acquits the alleged mastermind, PLtCol. Rafael Dumlao.
- June 8 – The Philippine Institute of Volcanology and Seismology issues a "level 3 alert" for Mayon Volcano in Albay due to the presence of volcanic earthquakes, indicating an increased risk of lava flows and possible eruptions. Albay Governor Edcel Greco Lagman orders the evacuation of residents within a 6 kilometers (3.7 mi) radius of the volcano.
- June 14 – Moro conflict: Islamic State–East Asia overall leader and Dawlah Islamiyah leader Fajarudin Benito (Abu Zacharia) and his lieutenant are killed in separate operations by combined security forces in Marawi.
- June 20 – The Sandiganbayan, in a publicized June 13 ruling, junks the bid of government prosecutors to present a new witness in the ill-gotten wealth case against personalities linked to former president Ferdinand Marcos and his wife Imelda due to a lack of merit.
- June 21 – COVID-19 vaccination in the Philippines: The government launches bivalent COVID-19 vaccines in the country.
- June 23 – Philippines–United Arab Emirates relations: UAE President Mohamed bin Zayed Al Nahyan grants President Marcos' request for humanitarian pardon to three imprisoned Filipinos, two on death row for drug trafficking and another serving a 15-year sentence for slander.
- June 27:
  - The Supreme Court declares as unconstitutional Republic Act No. 11935, a law postponing the barangay and Sangguniang Kabataan elections originally scheduled in 2022; however, orders the one scheduled in October to proceed. The decision would be affirmed by the court on October 24.
  - The Supreme Court unanimously disbars Presidential Adviser for Poverty Alleviation Larry Gadon from the Integrated Bar of the Philippines in relation to a video circulated online containing his usage of inappropriate language against journalist Raissa Robles.
  - Sandiganbayan dismisses a civil case filed in 1987 by the Presidential Commission on Good Government against twelve individuals, including former president Ferdinand Marcos, his heirs, and their alleged cronies, which involves allegations on illegally-acquired properties, citing lack of evidence. The decision would be upheld on August 8.
  - The Department of Tourism, during its 50th anniversary, unveils the country's new tourism slogan Love the Philippines, replacing the decade-old It's More Fun in the Philippines!
- June 29 – The Court of Appeals affirms the decision of the Office of the Ombudsman that dismissing several Immigration employees in connection to the so-called "pastillas scheme", which allowed the illegal entry of Chinese citizens into the country.
- June 30:
  - The Sandiganbayan finds former Davao del Norte's 1st district representative Arrel Olaño guilty of three counts of graft, three counts of malversation, and one count of direct bribery in connection with the pork barrel scam.
  - The Supreme Court, in a publicized February 21 ruling, reverses the conviction of Robert Uy and James Go Ong, who were found guilty in 2014 over the possession of over 119 kilos of shabu in 2003.

=== July ===
- July 2 – The Supreme Court, in a publicized June 13 ruling, issues a Writ of Kalikasan against Altai Philippines Mining Corporation, the Department of Environment and Natural Resources, and the Mines and Geosciences Bureau in relation to a petition seeking to protect Sibuyan Island in Romblon from environmental destruction due to mining activities.
- July 3:
  - Myanmar–Philippines relations: The Department of Foreign Affairs downgrades the alert level status in Myanmar from "Alert Level 4" to "Alert Level 2" and allowing overseas Filipino workers to return to the country affected by the February 2021 military coup.
  - The Sandiganbayan finds former La Union's 2nd district representative Thomas Dumpit Jr. not guilty of graft and malversation charges over the alleged use of ₱14.5 million worth of Dumpit's pork barrel for "fictitious projects".
- July 4 – The Philippine Atmospheric, Geophysical and Astronomical Services Administration declares the beginning of El Niño, with its effects expected to occur in the country starting October.
- July 7 – President Marcos signs into law the New Agrarian Emancipation Act, canceling over ₱57.56 billion in agricultural debt for more than 500,000 farmers.
- July 8 – Carmona becomes a component city in the province of Cavite after ratification of Republic Act 11938.
- July 9 – The Catholic Bishops' Conference of the Philippines approves the elevation of the Quiapo Church in Manila to national shrine status.
- July 12:
  - The Supreme Court dismisses the Public Attorney's Office's request to remove a provision on conflict of interest in its Code of Professional Responsibility and Accountability, which governs the conduct of Filipino lawyers in private and professional matters.
  - Territorial disputes in the South China Sea: The Movie and Television Review and Classification Board requests American film distributor Warner Bros. Pictures to censor a scene in the film Barbie that includes a map displaying the internationally contested nine-dash line in the South China Sea before releasing the film in the country.
- July 16 – The Supreme Court, in a publicized March 29 ruling, orders the rearrest of former Palawan governor Joel Reyes over the killing of environmentalist and broadcaster Gerry Ortega in January 2011.
- July 18:
  - President Marcos signs the Maharlika Investment Fund, the country's first sovereign wealth fund, into law.
  - Philippine drug war: The International Criminal Court denies the government's appeal against the resumption of the investigation by prosecutor Karim Khan into the killings attributed to the drug war during the leadership of Rodrigo Duterte as Davao City mayor and the country's president.
- July 19:
  - The Supreme Court publishes a March 29 ruling, affirming the decision of Sandiganbayan in September 2019 dismissing the forfeiture case against former president Ferdinand Marcos, his wife Imelda, and five others.
  - The Supreme Court, in a publicized March 15 ruling, orders the Makati government to pay the Bureau of Internal Revenue a total of ₱1.26 billion in deficiency taxes plus interests covering the years 1999 to 2001 and 2002 to 2004.
  - The Supreme Court, in a publicized March 27 ruling, temporarily disbars former press secretary Trixie Cruz-Angeles for the use of inappropriate language in a legal proceeding, a violation of the lawyer's code.
- July 21 – President Bongbong Marcos formally ends the declaration of COVID-19 as a public health emergency.
- July 25:
  - President Marcos issues a proclamation lifting the state of national emergency due to lawless violence, imposed in Mindanao through a declaration issued by his predecessor in 2016.
  - President Marcos accepts the courtesy resignations of 18 high-ranking police officers allegedly involved in illegal drug activities.
- July 26–27 – Super Typhoon Doksuri (Egay) hits northern Luzon, affecting the entire country. At least 30 people are killed; damages reach ₱15.3 billion with Cagayan, Ilocos Norte, Ilocos Sur, and Abra the most devastated. (Note: Reported deaths in MB Princess Aya accident is not included in the National Disaster Risk Reduction and Management Council's official toll on Typhoon Egay; the accident occurred as the cyclone is already outside the Philippine Area of Responsibility, although it strengthened the southwest monsoon. Some media outlets still include the casualties otherwise.) (Note: Super Typhoon Egay: Some of these effects are as a result of tropical cyclones Egay and Falcon which both intensified the southwest monsoon. Official figures according to NDRRMC.: Displaced individuals (Aug. 2): around 289,000.; Most of deaths are from the CAR, also from Ilocos Region, Western Visayas, Davao Region; nine also remain missing.; Damages reported in worst-hit areas: Cagayan Valley, about ₱3B combined (₱1.7B in agriculture, by Aug. 4; ₱1.156B in infrastructure, by July 27); in Cagayan, ₱1.806B (by Aug. 8).; In Ilocos Region, ₱4.54B; in Ilocos Norte, at least ₱3B; in Ilocos Sur, ₱1.2B (as of July 29).; Cordillera Administrative Region, about ₱2.74B combined (by Aug. 6; region has highest amount of infrastructure damage at ₱2.262B; while ₱474M in agriculture); in Abra, ₱1.5B (in infrastructure alone; as of Aug. 3.).; By Aug. 8, state of calamity has been declared in 233+ areas in the Ilocos Region, Cagayan Valley, CAR, Central Luzon, Calabarzon, Mimaropa.; Damages are reported in these regions, in addition to Bicol Region, Western Visayas, Northern Mindanao, Davao Region, Soccsksargen, BARMM; infrastructural damages in Eastern Visayas; agricultural damages in the rest of Mindanao. two other regions are affected as well.)
- July 27:
  - The overloaded motorized boat M/B Princess Aya Express capsizes in the vicinity of Talim Island in Laguna de Bay off Binangonan, Rizal, after being hit by strong winds while heading for the island; 27 of 68 individuals on board die.
  - Manila Regional Trial Court publicizes a July 17 ruling, acquitting three activists, including Reina Mae Nasino, who lost her infant daughter while in detention, of illegal possession of firearms and explosives due to lack of evidence.

=== August ===
- August 1 – The Anti-Terrorism Council, through a resolution dated July 26, designates as terrorists suspended Negros Oriental's 3rd district representative Arnolfo Teves Jr., being the leader of an alleged armed group, along with twelve members; as well as two militants including the wife of slain Islamic State leader.
- August 5 – The bill on estate tax amnesty extension lapses into law as Republic Act No. 11956, effective until June 14, 2025.
- August 7 – Former AFP military comptroller and retired major general Carlos Garcia, convicted in 2022 for illegally amassing ₱303 million during his stint from 1993 to 2004, is released from the New Bilibid Prison after serving time and earning good conduct time allowance credits.
- August 8 – A road rage incident occurs in Quezon City involving a former police officer who, while driving his car, cut off a male cyclist on the bicycle lane near Welcome Rotonda and pointed a gun at him afterwards. A settlement is allegedly made between both parties. However, footage of the incident went viral online on August 27, resulting in public outcry leading to an investigation and the revocation of both his driving and firearms licenses. The incident also leads to the resignation of Quezon City Police District Director Brigadier General Nicolas Torre III, who was criticized for organizing a press conference on behalf of the perpetrator.
- August 9 – The Supreme Court nullifies the proclamation of re-electionist Zamboanga del Norte's 1st district representative Romeo Jalosjos Jr. and orders the Commission on Elections to proclaim Roberto Uy Jr. for the same position.
- August 15 – Authorities confirm the detention of former broadcaster Jay Sonza, who has been arrested on July 18. Charges of illegal recruitment will be dismissed by Quezon City Regional Trial Courts the following day. On August 22, Sonza is temporarily released upon posting bail for his pending estafa and libel cases.
- August 16:
  - The House of Representatives unanimously expels Negros Oriental's 3rd district representative Arnolfo Teves Jr. due to misconduct; the first time for a chamber of Congress to do so.
  - The Bangsamoro Transition Authority unanimously approves eight laws organizing the barangays in the Special Geographic Area of the Bangsamoro, all located in Cotabato, into eight new municipalities. A plebiscite is yet to be held.
- August 24–30 – Warning signals due to super typhoon Saola (Goring) are raised in northern Luzon, mainly Cagayan Valley; the highest in a part of Babuyan Islands prior to its exit. The cyclone, followed by the other two, affects Luzon and part of Visayas. Damages are estimated at ₱2.42 billion with Western Visayas, Cagayan Valley and Cordillera Administrative Region the worst-hit. (Note: Super Typhoon Saola (Goring): Some of these effects are as a result of tropical cyclones Goring, Hanna and Ineng which both intensified the southwest monsoon. Official figures according to NDRRMC.: As of Sept. 7, there are 2 reported deaths and 2 missing; both in Western Visayas and reportedly in Cordillera Administrative Region.; Displaced individuals (Sept. 3): 52,072; DA reports agricultural damage at ₱1.76B (in its final report, Sept. 20), higher than an estimate by NDRRMC.; Damages are reported in Cagayan Valley, Cordillera Administrative Region, Central Luzon, Mimaropa and Western Visayas, as well as Ilocos Region and Calabarzon; agricultural damages in Bicol Region. National Capital Region is also affected.; As of Sept. 5, state of calamity has been declared in at least two cities and six municipalities in Western Visayas.)
- August 31 – A fire at a clothing factory in Tandang Sora, Quezon City, kills fifteen people, mostly workers.

=== September ===
- September 1 – The government imposes price ceilings on rice to counter increasing costs and alleged market manipulation, setting the maximum prices for regular-milled and well-milled rice, at ₱41 (US$0.72) and ₱45 ($0.80) per kilogram, respectively.
- September 6 – The Quezon City Metropolitan Trial Court releases a July 14 resolution dismissing the conspiracy to commit sedition case against eight individuals, including former senator Antonio Trillanes and "Bikoy", in connection with the 2019 Ang Totoong Narcolist (The Real Narcolist) video.
- September 12:
  - The Pasig Regional Trial Court acquits Rappler and its chief executive officer Maria Ressa in the last of the tax evasion cases filed against them.
  - The Vatican grants the petition of the Catholic Bishops' Conference of the Philippines to establish the Permanent Diaconate in the Philippines.
- September 14 – Murder of Jullebee Ranara: A Kuwaiti court finds Ranara's killer guilty of murder and sentences him to 15 years of imprisonment.
- September 15 – The Sandiganbayan finds three former officials of the Technology and Livelihood Resource Center guilty of misusing ₱9.6 million for ghost livelihood projects in 2007 in connection with the pork barrel scam.
- September 20 – The Philippines becomes one of the signatories of the United Nations High Seas Treaty under the 1982 UN Convention on the Law of the Sea.
- September 22 – The Taal Volcano in Batangas releases elevated levels of sulfur dioxide and vog, resulting in school closures, including in Metro Manila, and residents avoiding outdoor activities.
- September 27 – President Marcos signs Republic Act No. 11961, known as the Trabaho Para sa Bayan Act (Jobs for the Nation Act).
- September 28 – The senate committees on public order and women and children launch a joint investigation into allegations that the Socorro Bayanihan Services led by Senior Agila is a cult which subjected minors to forced marriages and sexual violence.

=== October ===
- October 2:
  - Pork barrel scam: The Sandiganbayan convicts Janet Lim-Napoles of corruption and former APEC Partylist representative Edgar Valdez of direct bribery, both in connection with the use of the Priority Development Assistance Fund; however, the court acquits them of plunder.
  - Three Filipino fishermen are killed and eleven others survive after their vessel is rammed by an unidentified foreign merchant ship near the Scarborough Shoal in the South China Sea.
- October 4 – President Marcos lifts the price ceiling on rice, around a month after its implementation.
- October 16:
  - The Philippine military demands China to stop "dangerous and offensive" actions in the South China Sea after a People's Liberation Army Navy ship performed "aggressive maneuvers" near the disputed Thitu Island.
  - Almost 25,000 people gather in a pro-Palestine demonstration in Cotabato City, condemning Israel's air raids on the Gaza Strip during the Gaza war.
- October 18 – President Marcos postpones the enactment of the Maharlika Investment Fund, the country's proposed first sovereign wealth fund, citing the need for further review.
- October 20 – Pork barrel scam: The Sandiganbayan convicts anew Janet Lim-Napoles of malversation of public funds and graft in connection with the Priority Development Assistance Fund of former South Cotabato's 2nd district representative Arthur Pingoy Jr., who is among those acquitted.
- October 22 – The Philippines reports separate collision incidents between its military ships and vessels of both the China Coast Guard and the Maritime Militia near the Second Thomas Shoal in the Spratly Islands.
- October 24 – Climate change in the Philippines: Albay declares a state of climate emergency and announces its commitment to reducing its carbon emissions to help mitigate the effects of the climate crisis.
- October 27 – Pork barrel scam: The Sandiganbayan, for the third time in October, convicts Janet Lim-Napoles for another case of malversation of public funds, involving the Priority Development Assistance Fund of Ilocos Sur's 1st district representative Salacnib Baterina; the latter, however, is acquitted.
- October 30:
  - The barangay and Sangguniang Kabataan elections are held. Originally scheduled for December 5, 2022, the elections had been postponed by virtue of Republic Act No. 11935, signed by President Marcos on October 10 of the same year.
  - Three people are killed and five others injured during two shootouts between supporters of rival candidates in Maguindanao del Norte and Lanao del Norte amid elections for barangay leaders.
  - Majority of voters in Bulacan reject in the plebiscite, held in accordance with Proclamation No. 1057, the status of San Jose del Monte as a highly urbanized city; the result would be declared two days later.

=== November ===
- November 4 – Japan–Philippines relations: Prime Minister Fumio Kishida becomes the first Japanese leader to address a joint session of Philippine Congress.
- November 5 – Radio host Juan Jumalon is fatally shot in Calamba, Misamis Occidental, during a live program. The attack is witnessed through Facebook.
- November 7 – The National Bureau of Investigation arrests Socorro Bayanihan Services president Jey Rence Quilario (Senior Agila) and other members of the alleged cult over alleged human trafficking.
- November 8 – Four Philippine universities enter the Quacquarelli Symonds Asia rankings for the first time, with the University of the Philippines remaining the top institution in the country.
- November 10 – China imposes "control measures" against Philippine vessels at a contested South China Sea location after a Philippine auxiliary ship entered the area which China deemed as infringing on its sovereignty.
- November 13 – The Muntinlupa RTC grants bail to former Senator Leila de Lima in connection with the third and last drug cases against her, ending her six years in detention.
- November 14 – The Supreme Court publicizes an October 3 decision affirming the Sandiganbayan's 2012 dismissal of the complaint filed by the Presidential Commission on Good Government against the estate of former president Ferdinand Marcos in relation to supposed ₱41 billion in unexplained wealth which also involved business magnate Lucio Tan.
- November 17:
  - Philippines–United States relations: The Philippines and the United States signs a landmark deal that would allow the latter to export nuclear technology and material to the former, which is exploring the use of nuclear power to decarbonize and boost energy independence.
  - An earthquake, whose epicenter is located off Sarangani, Davao Occidental, hits Davao and Soccsksargen regions. At least nine people are killed. (Note: Mindanao earthquake: The magnitude is recorded at 6.8 by PHIVOLCS; while at 6.7 by USGS. Figures as of Nov. 21, 2023: Affected regions are Davao and Soccsksargen.; Casualties: As per DOH: 11 deaths are reported; 730 individuals are ill and injured.; As per NDRRMC: 9 deaths and 16 injuries are reported. Fatalities are from Sarangani, Davao Occidental, and General Santos.; Damages: 1,544 houses; 21 roads and bridges; at least 112 buildings. Majority of them are reported in Sarangani.; Affected individuals: 16,293.; In Glan, Sarangani alone, it is reported that over 20,000 families are affected; about 3,000 houses were destroyed.)
- November 23 – The Sandiganbayan finds former Datu Unsay, Maguindanao del Sur mayor Andal Ampatuan Jr. guilty of 21 counts of graft over the supply of fuel to the provincial government from a petroleum station he owned.
- November 24 – President Marcos grants amnesty to members of rebel groups including former members of the Communist Party of the Philippines–New People's Army–National Democratic Front of the Philippines (CPP–NPA–NDF).
- November 28 – The government announces that they have agreed with communist rebels, represented by the NDF, to resume peace talks on the New People's Army rebellion after six years.
- November 29 – The Commission on Elections disqualifies service provider Smartmatic from participating in future elections in the Philippines.

=== December ===
- December 1 – An encounter between the army and suspected members of Dawlah Islamiyah in Datu Hoffer Ampatuan, Maguindanao del Sur leaves eleven deaths from the militant group.
- December 2:
  - An earthquake, whose epicenter is located off Hinatuan, Surigao del Sur, strikes major parts of Mindanao and Visayas. Three people are killed. (Note: Eastern Mindanao earthquake: The magnitude is recorded at 7.4 by PHIVOLCS; while at 7.6 by USGS. Figures as of as Dec. 10, as per NDRRMC: Casualties: Deaths: 3 (2 in Caraga, 1 in Davao Region); Injuries: 88; Affected individuals: 704,076; Damages: almost 4,000 houses, mostly in Caraga (as of Dec. 6); in Surigao del Sur—at least ₱220 million (infrastructural and agricultural combined, by Dec. 10); Hinatuan is the hardest hit with that incurring ₱98.5 million (as of Dec. 4).)
  - Abu Sayyaf Group leader Mundi Sawadjaan is killed in a clash with government forces in the municipal waters between Tipo-Tipo and Tuburan in Basilan.
- December 3 – Mindanao State University bombing: A bomb explodes during a Mass at Mindanao State University in Marawi, Lanao del Sur, killing four people.
- December 5 – A passenger bus passing the Iloilo City–Culasi route and reportedly carrying 28 people falls into a ravine in Hamtic, Antique, killing 19.
- December 11 – The Senate unanimously ratifies the Violence and Harassment Convention of the International Labour Organization.
- December 14 – The Philippines secures a seat in the board of the "Loss and Damage" fund mobilized by the 28th Climate Change Conference (COP28) to help vulnerable countries cope with the increasingly costly impacts of climate disasters.
- December 21:
  - The Securities and Exchange Commission announces the conviction on December 12 of three KAPA personnel including its leader Joel Apolinario, masterminds of what would be the country's largest investment scam, by the Butuan Regional Trial Court for syndicated fraud. They are sentenced to life imprisonment.
  - The National Telecommunications Commission announces the imposition two days earlier of a 30-day suspension of the broadcast operations of Sonshine Media Network International over alleged violations of its legislative franchise.
- December 25 – Nine New People's Army rebels are killed by the Armed Forces of the Philippines during clashes near Malaybalay, Bukidnon, amid a unilateral truce declared by the communist rebels.

== Holidays ==
On August 23, 2022, through Proclamation No. 42, the national government declares holidays and special (working/non-working) days to be observed in the country. The circular was later amended through Proclamation No. 90, issued on November 11, with some holidays adjusted pursuant to the holiday economics principle.

=== Regular ===
- January 1 – New Year's Day
- April 6 – Maundy Thursday
- April 7 – Good Friday
- April 21 – Eid'l Fitr (Feast of Ramadan) (By virtue of a later proclamation; later determined to fall on April 22 as per moon sighting by the Bangsamoro Darul Ifta'.)
- May 1 – Labor Day
- June 12 – Independence Day
- June 28 – Eid'l Adha (Feast of Sacrifice) (By virtue of a later proclamation.)
- August 28 – National Heroes Day
- November 27 – Bonifacio Day (Actually, November 30; considered as regular holiday by virtue of Proclamation No. 90.)
- December 25 – Christmas Day
- December 30 – Rizal Day

=== Special (Non-working) ===
Chinese New Year, a then special non-working day which was celebrated on January 22, as well as Christmas Eve (December 24), declared since 2021 as a special working day, are not in the list.

- January 2 – Additional special non-working day (By virtue of Proclamation No. 90.)
- February 24 – EDSA People Power Revolution Anniversary (Actually, February 25; adjusted by virtue of a later proclamation.)
- April 8 – Black Saturday
- April 10 – Araw ng Kagitingan (Day of Valor) (Actually, April 9; considered as regular holiday by virtue of Proclamation No. 90.)
- August 21 – Ninoy Aquino Day
- October 30 – Election Day (Barangay and Sangguniang Kabataan) (By virtue of a later proclamation.)
- November 1 – All Saints Day
- November 2 – All Souls' Day (Reverted to, yet declared as "additional" special non-working day.)
- December 8 – Feast of the Immaculate Conception
- December 26 – Special non-working day (By virtue of a later proclamation.)
- December 31 – Last Day of the Year (Reverted to being a special non-working holiday.)

== Business and economy ==
=== February ===
- February 21 – The Senate ratifies the Regional Comprehensive Economic Partnership, finalizing the Philippines' membership in the world's largest trade bloc.

=== June ===
- June 5 – The Bangko Sentral ng Pilipinas (BSP) launches the commemorative coin set for the 125th anniversary of Philippine independence.
- June 20 – The BSP and its partner retailers launch coin dispenser machines across the Greater Manila Area, allowing the public to deposit coins in exchange for online wallet credits or shopping vouchers of equal value.
- June 26 – The Philippines signs loan agreements worth US$1.14 billion with the World Bank, set to finance government initiatives on economic recovery and developing the agriculture and fisheries sectors, among others.

=== July ===
- July 7 – The Philippines signs loan agreements worth $600 million with the World Bank to boost the agriculture and fisheries sectors in the country.
- July 19:
  - The National Economic and Development Authority (NEDA) approves the proposal to privatize Ninoy Aquino International Airport (NAIA).
  - NEDA approves the unsolicited proposal for the private sector to take over the maintenance and operations of Laguindingan Airport in Misamis Oriental.
- July 26–30 – The deactivation of unregistered SIM cards starts after the registration deadline on July 25 by virtue of Republic Act No. 11934, or the SIM Registration Act. Subscribers are given 5-day grace period to register the same.

=== September ===
- September 14 – The Philippines overtakes China as the world's top rice importer, according to the report by the United States Department of Agriculture.
- September 15 – Six Philippine companies are included in the Time Magazine's list of World's Best Companies of 2023.
- September 21 – The Dito Telecommunity signs a $3.9-billion 15-year long-term project finance facility.
- September 29 – The NTC renews the license of Now Telecom by assigning the latter on 800 MHz frequency to operate as fourth telco in the country. Commercial operations will start by 2024.

=== October ===
- October 5 – The Asian Development Bank announces the approval of a $300-million policy-based loan to support the Philippine government’s financial inclusion efforts.
- October 9 – The Supreme Court affirms with modification a Court of Appeals decision and rules that Banco de Oro is solely liable to one of its depositors over unauthorized withdrawals amounting to over ₱8 million.

== Entertainment and culture ==
=== January ===
- January 15 – Celeste Cortesi finishes unplaced at Miss Universe 2022 in New Orleans, Louisiana, United States. The Philippines ends its 12-year placement streak at the said pageant since 2010.
- January 23 – Van Ferro wins his third BroadwayWorld Chicago Award for Best Supporting Performer in a Play, his second consecutive in the category. He ties Rachelle Ann Go for the most BroadwayWorld Award wins by a Filipino actor outside of the Philippines and the first actor in Chicago to win back-to-back BroadwayWorld Awards.
- January 29 – Maria Luisa Varela is crowned Miss Planet International in Phnom Penh, Cambodia. She becomes the Philippines' first representative to win the said pageant.

=== February ===
- February 1 – ALV Pageant Circle announces their decision to end its partnership with Miss Supranational and not to renew their franchise, cancelling what would be its inaugural national pageant in March.
- February 15:
  - The province of Kalinga claims two Guinness World Record titles for the largest performance of the banga dance and largest gong ensemble, with more than 8,000 participants in total, both performed in Tabuk.
  - The Mutya ng Pilipinas Organization announces the acquisition of the Miss Intercontinental franchise, effective this year.
- February 16 – Annabelle McDonnell finishes as first runner-up at Miss Charm 2023 in Vietnam.

=== March ===
- March 11 – Lars Pacheco of Bulacan is crowned as Miss International Queen Philippines 2023 during the coronation night held at the Aliw Theater in Pasay.
- March 26 – Ingrid Santamaría finishes in the Top 14 at Reina Hispanoamericana 2022 in Bolivia.
- March 29 – The Mutya ng Pilipinas Organization announces the acquisition of Miss Chinese World and Miss Environment International franchises.
- March 30 – Vogue Philippines features tattoo artist Apo Whang-od for the April issue, becoming the oldest cover model of the global fashion magazine.

=== April ===
- April 11 – Awarding ceremony for the first edition of the Summer Metro Manila Film Festival is held at the New Frontier Theater in Quezon City, with About Us But Not About Us winning the most awards, including Best Picture.
- April 29 – Yllana Marie Aduana of Siniloan, Laguna is crowned Miss Philippines Earth 2023 in the pageant's coronation event held in Toledo, Cebu.

=== May ===
- May 13 – Michelle Dee of Makati is crowned Miss Universe Philippines 2023 in the pageant's coronation event held at the SM Mall of Asia Arena in Pasay. The following day, another pageant's candidate, Pauline Amelinckx of Bohol, is crowned Miss Supranational Philippines 2023 at a separate ceremony at Okada Manila in Parañaque.
- May 18 – Seven Filipinos are included in Forbes’ roster of 30 Under 30 Asia 2023, which is composed of young entrepreneurs and trailblazers across the Asia-Pacific region.
- May 20 – Annie Uson Chen is crowned Miss Chinese World in Kuala Lumpur, Malaysia.
- May 24 – Bohol is recognized as the country's first UNESCO Global Geopark.
- May 28 – The coronation event of the Binibining Pilipinas 2023 pageant is held at the Smart Araneta Coliseum in Quezon City. Angelica Lopez of Palawan and Anna Valencia Lakrini of Bataan are crowned Binibining Pilipinas International and Binibining Pilipinas Globe, respectively.

=== June ===
- June 1 – Robert Douglas Walcher IV is crowned Mister Teen International in Bangkok, Thailand.
- June 9 – Juan Luna's 1889 painting Hymen, oh Hyménée!, which had been publicly concealed since the 1889 Paris Exposition Universelle where Luna won the bronze medal, is unveiled for the first time in the Philippines at the Ayala Museum in Makati.
- June 14 – The Philippines' Hannah Arnold is ranked among the eight best national costumes in last year's Miss International pageant.
- June 15 – Shannon Robinson is crowned Miss Environment International in Mumbai, India.
- June 16 – James Reggie Vidal finishes Second Runner-Up at the Man of the World 2023 pageant held in the Philippines.
- June 24 – Lars Pacheco finishes in the Top 6 at Miss International Queen 2023 in Thailand.
- June 27 – Michael Ver Comaling finishes as third runner-up at Mister National Universe 2023 in Thailand.

=== July ===
- July 13–15 – The Aliwan Fiesta is held at the Aliw Theater in Pasay. The Tribu Parianon representing the Dinagyang Festival of Iloilo City wins the streetdance competition, Kiara Liane Wellington from Cebu is crowned Reyna ng Aliwan (Queen of Entertainment), the tenth straight time a Cebuana won the pageant, and the Halamanan Festival of Guiguinto, Bulacan, wins the float competition.
- July 13 – Nikki de Moura of Cagayan de Oro is crowned Miss Grand Philippines 2023 in the pageant's coronation event held at the SM Mall of Asia Arena in Pasay.
- July 15 – Pauline Amelinckx finishes as first runner-up at Miss Supranational 2023 in Poland.
- July 16 – Johannes Rissler finishes in the Top 20 at Mister Supranational 2023 in Poland.
- July 26 – Actress Kathryn Bernardo is named as one of the recipients of the Outstanding Asian Star Prize at the 2023 Seoul International Drama Awards.

=== August ===
- August 10 – Miss Supranational 2023 first runner-up Pauline Amelinckx is crowned the first-ever The Miss Philippines.
- August 11:
  - Anne Patricia Lorenzo finishes as first runner-up at Miss Equality World 2023 in Indonesia.
  - John Lloyd Cruz wins the Boccalino d'Oro prize for best actor at the 76th Locarno International Film Festival in Switzerland for his role in Lav Diaz's Essential Truths of the Lake.
- August 13:
  - The animated film Iti Mapukpukaw is awarded Best Film in the full-length feature category at the 19th Cinemalaya Independent Film Festival at the Philippine International Convention Center.
  - The family drama film Family Matters wins four awards including Best Picture, while Nadine Lustre wins Best Actress for her performance in the film Greed, at the 2023 FAMAS Awards.
- August 24 – The romantic comedy film An Inconvenient Love wins the Best Asian Feature Film award in the 2023 ContentAsia Awards.

=== September ===
- September 4 – The Miss Philippines Organization announces its acquisition of the Miss Asia Pacific International franchise.
- September 17 – Jefferson Bunney finishes in the Top 10 at Mister International 2023 in Thailand.

=== October ===
- October 4 – Captivating Katkat wins the second season of Drag Race Philippines.
- October 8 – Ivan Ignacio finishes as second runner-up at Mister Cosmopolitan 2023 in Malaysia.
- October 24 – Alethea Ambrosio of Bulacan is crowned The Miss Philippines 2023 pageant held at the SM Mall of Asia Arena in Pasay.
- October 25 – Nikki de Moura finishes unplaced at Miss Grand International 2023 in Vietnam.
- October 26 – Nicole Borromeo finishes third runner-up at Miss International 2023 in Japan.
- October 29 – Katherine Topsnik of Central Eastern Visayas is crowned Binibining Silka 2023 pageant held at the New Frontier Theater in Quezon City.
- October 31 – UNESCO designates Iloilo City as a City of Gastronomy, the first Philippine city to be so.

=== November ===
- November 1 – The Philippines' Nicole Borromeo is ranked among the seven best evening gowns in this year's Miss International pageant.
- November 18 – Anna Valencia Lakrini finishes second runner-up at Miss Globe 2023 in Albania.
- November 19 – Michelle Dee finishes in the Top 10 at Miss Universe 2023 in El Salvador.
- November 29 – Elda Aznar finishes first runner-up at Miss CosmoWorld 2023 in Malaysia.

=== December ===
- December 1 – The Philippines receives four major tourism recognitions from the annual World Travel Awards, including the country's first, World's Leading City Destination, for Manila.
- December 5:
  - The government announces the designation of piña handloom weaving of Aklan in the UNESCO Representative List of the Intangible Cultural Heritage of Humanity.
  - The Intellectual Property Office of the Philippines (IPOPHL) cancels the trademark registration of Television and Production Exponents, Inc. (TAPE) for the names "Eat Bulaga" and "EB".
- December 14 – The 8th Asia Artist Awards are held at the Philippine Arena in Bocaue, Bulacan.
- December 15:
  - Iona Gibbs finishes in the Top 22 at Miss Intercontinental 2023 in Egypt.
  - President Marcos issues a proclamation declaring nine artisans (Adelita Bagcal, Abina Coguit, Sakinur-ain Delasas, Bundos Fara, Marife Ganahon, Amparo Mabanag, Samporonia Madanlo, Barbara Ofong, and Rosie Sula) as National Living Treasures.
- December 22 – Yllana Aduana finishes Miss Earth Air 2023 at Miss Earth 2023 in Vietnam.

== Deaths ==
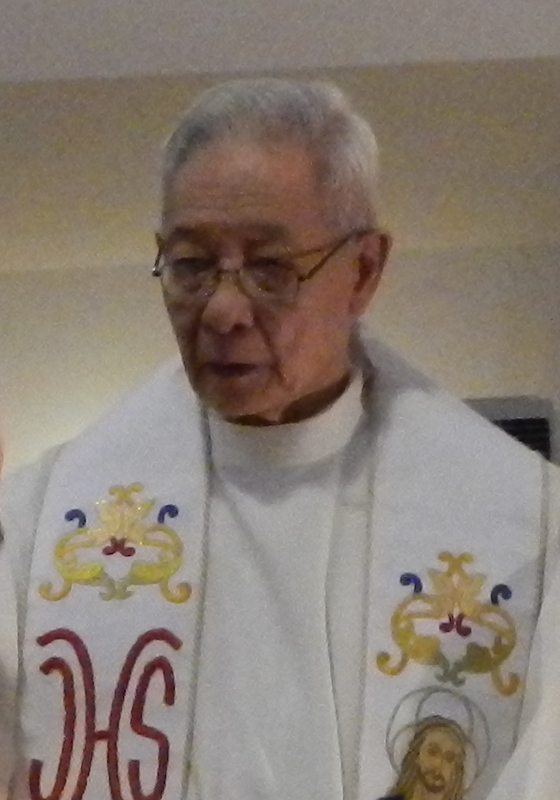
Catalino Arevalo

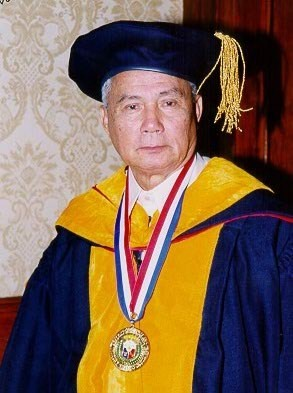
Angel Alcala

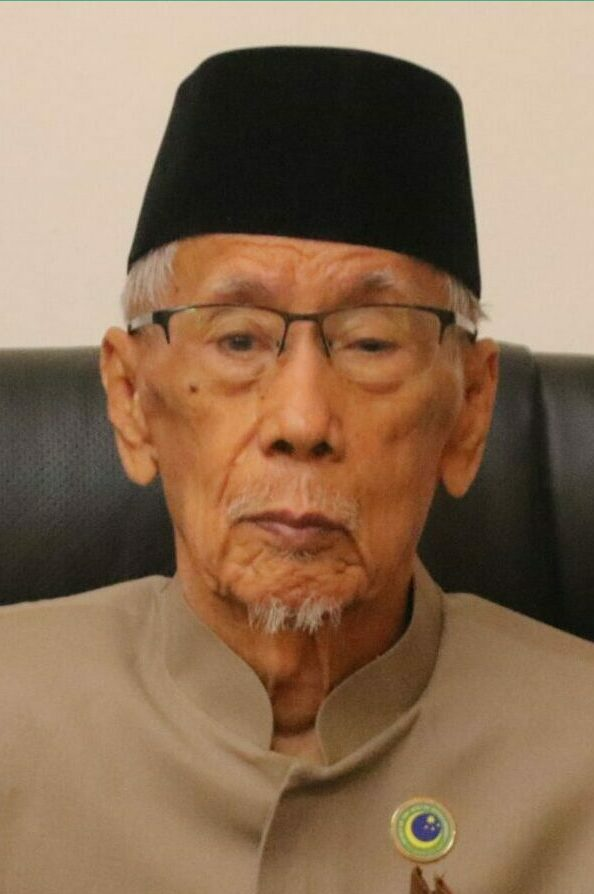
Khalipha Nando

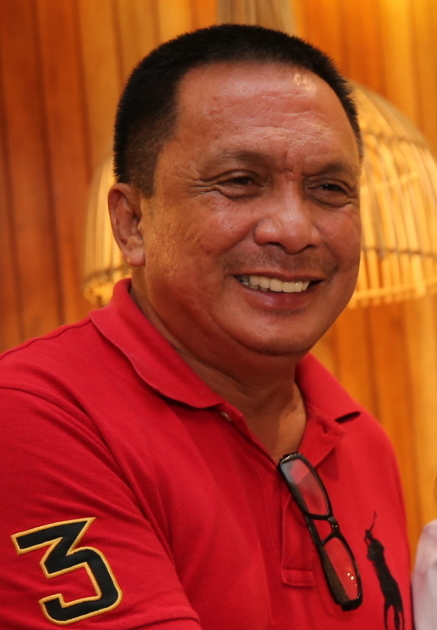
Roel Degamo

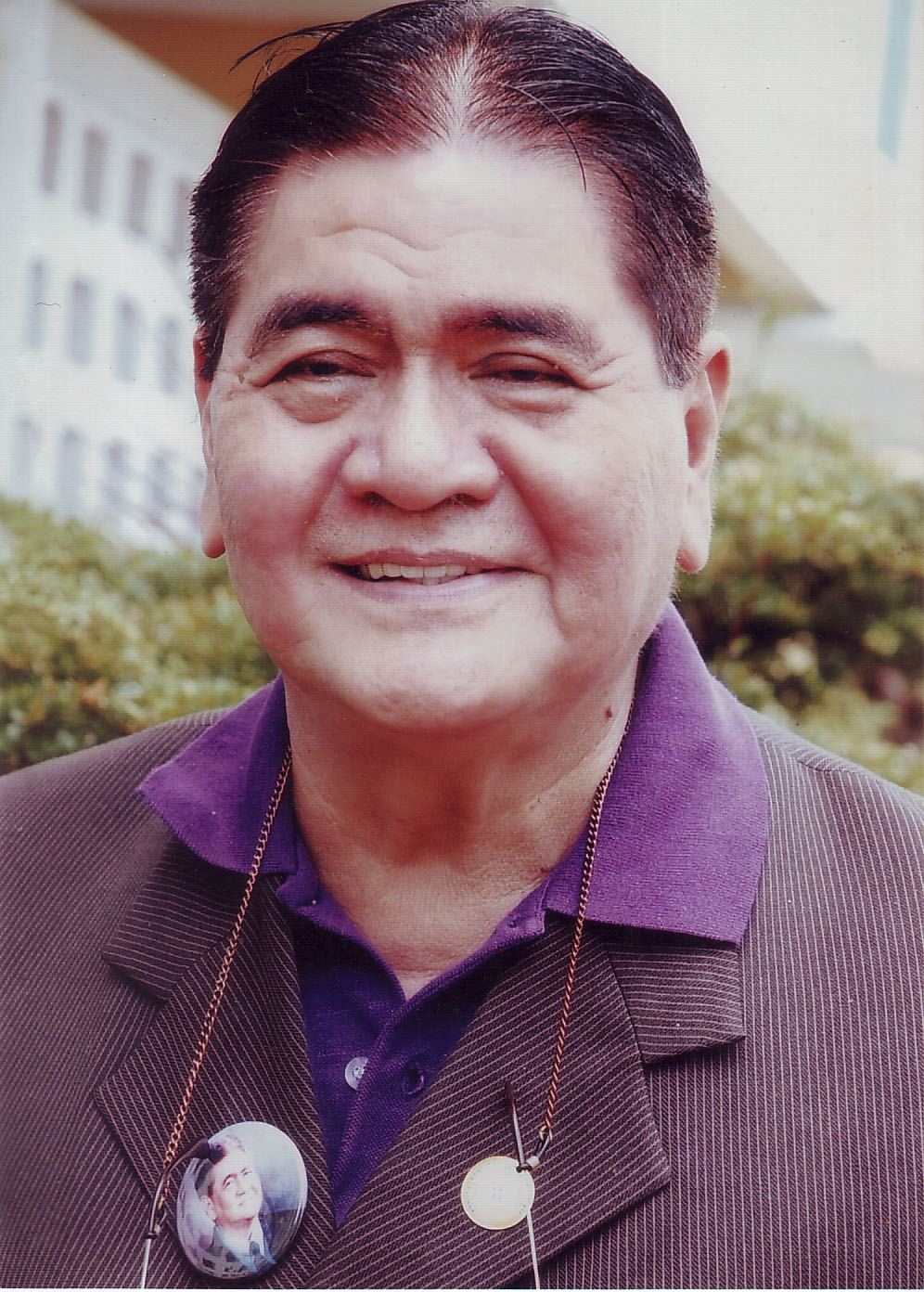
Jose David Lapuz

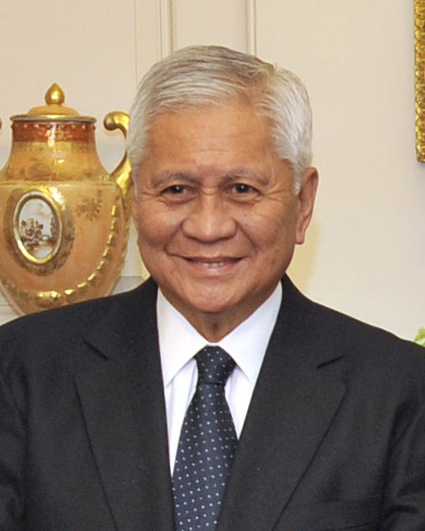
Albert del Rosario

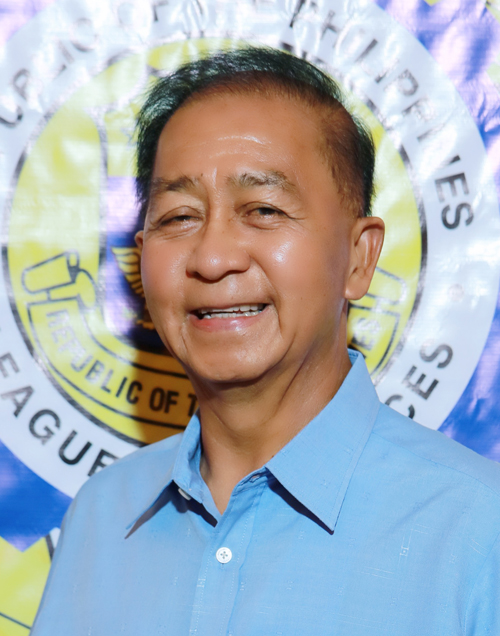
Carlos Padilla

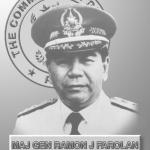
Ramon Farolan

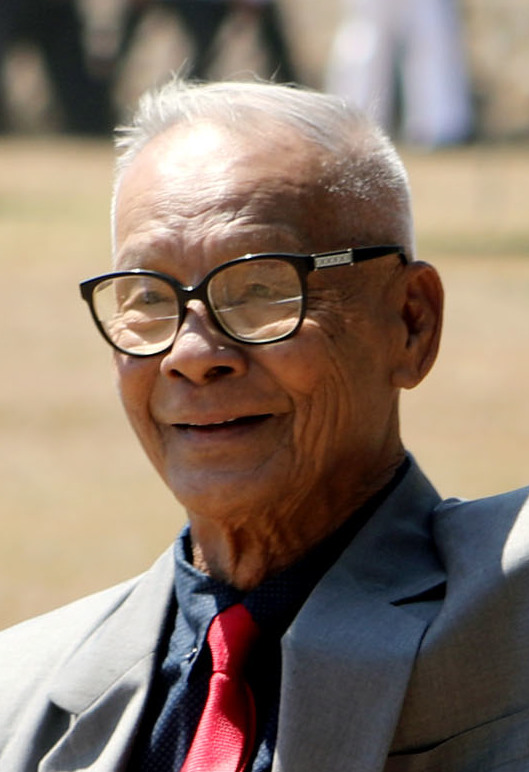
Rodolfo Biazon

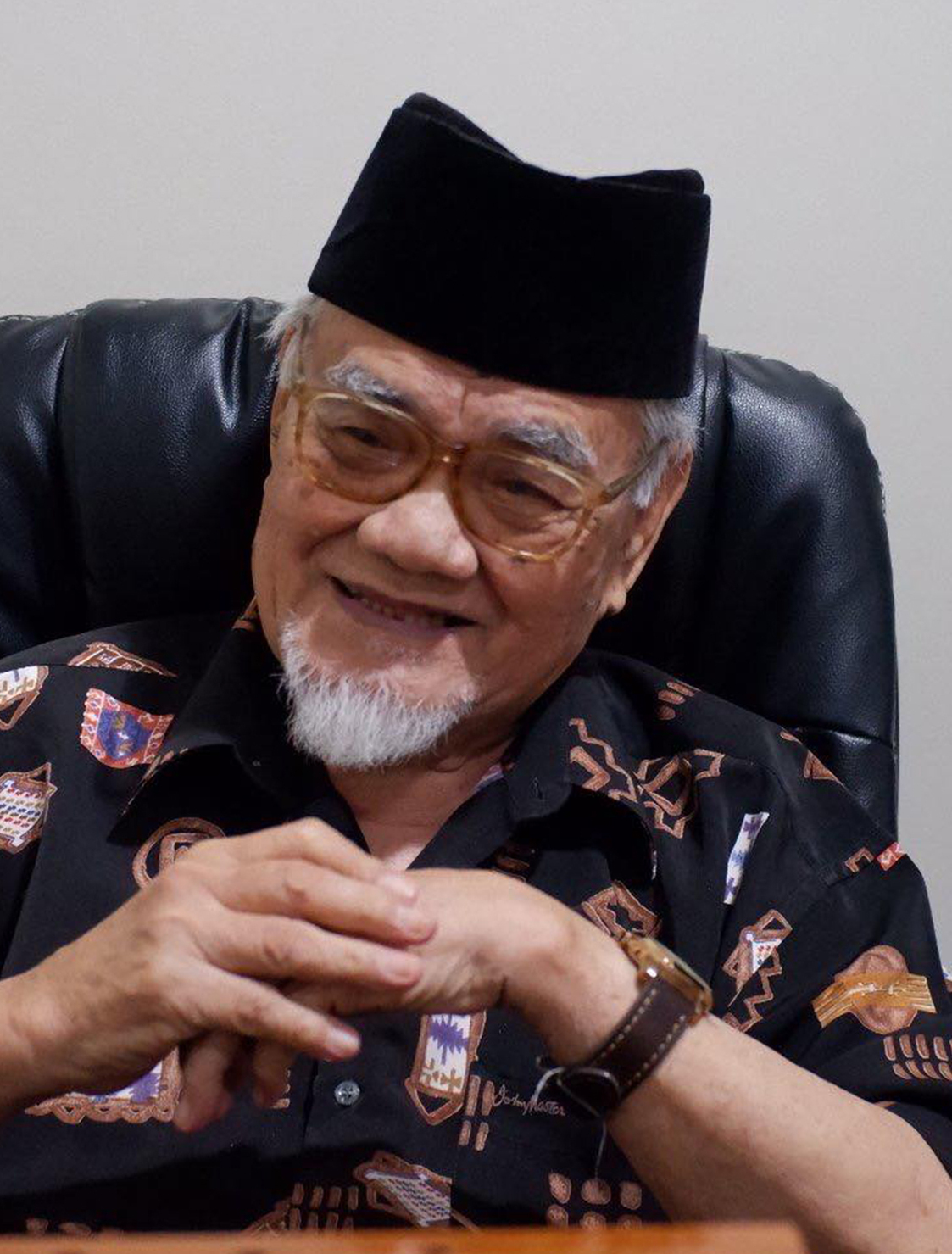
Abuhuraira Udasan

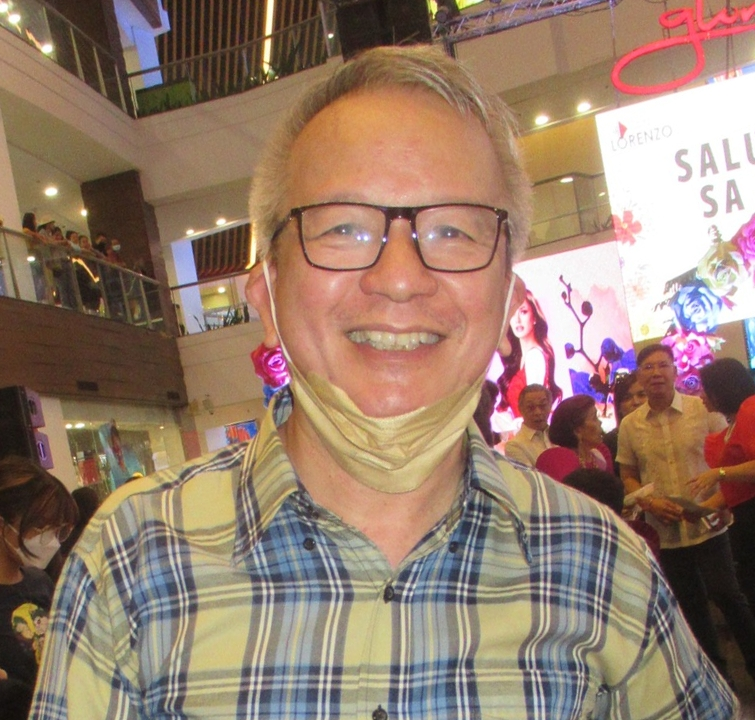
Mario Dumaual

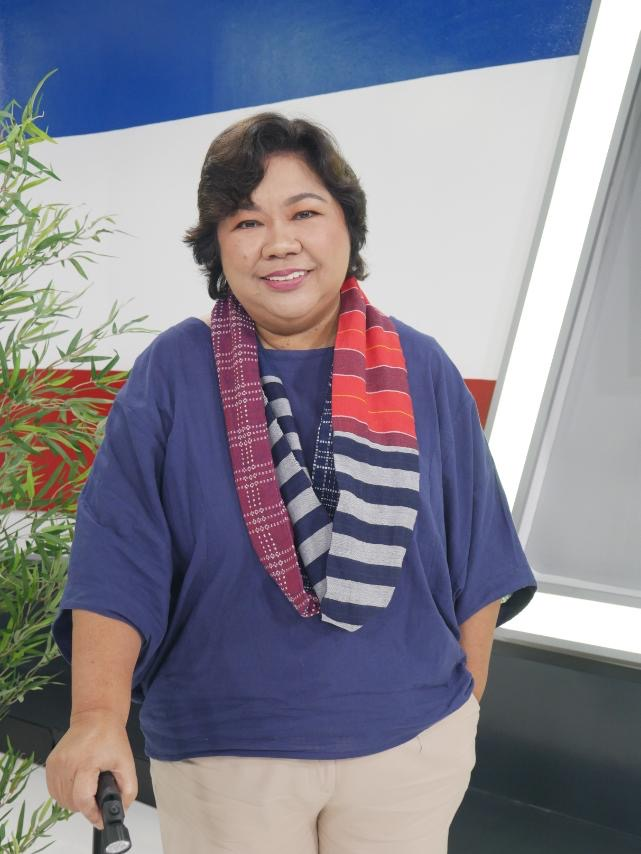
Susan Ople

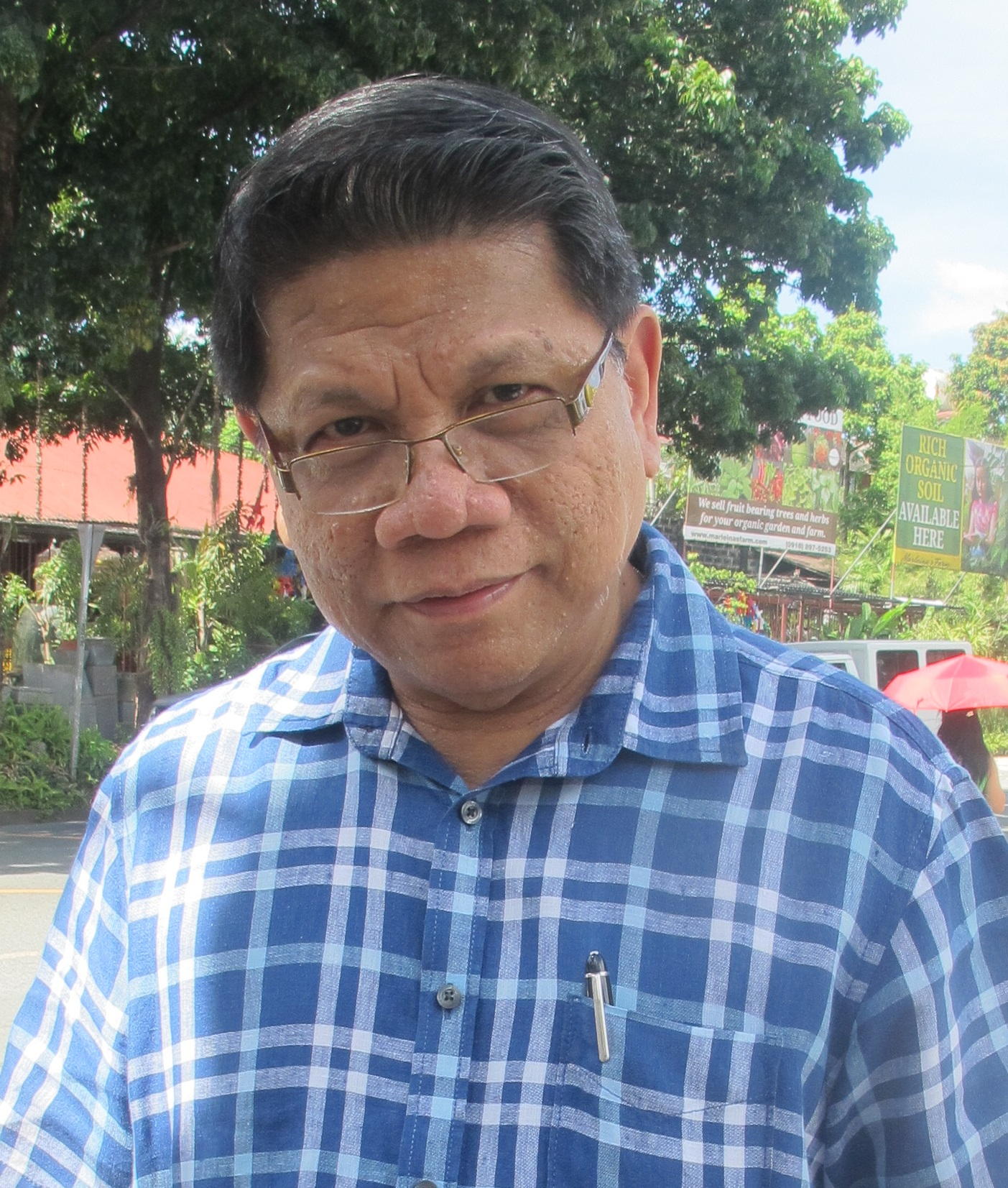
Mike Enriquez

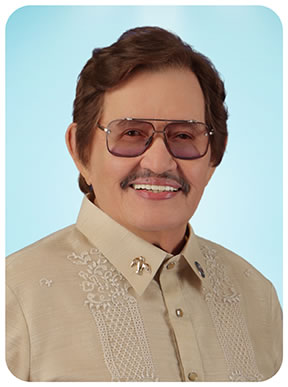
Edward Hagedorn

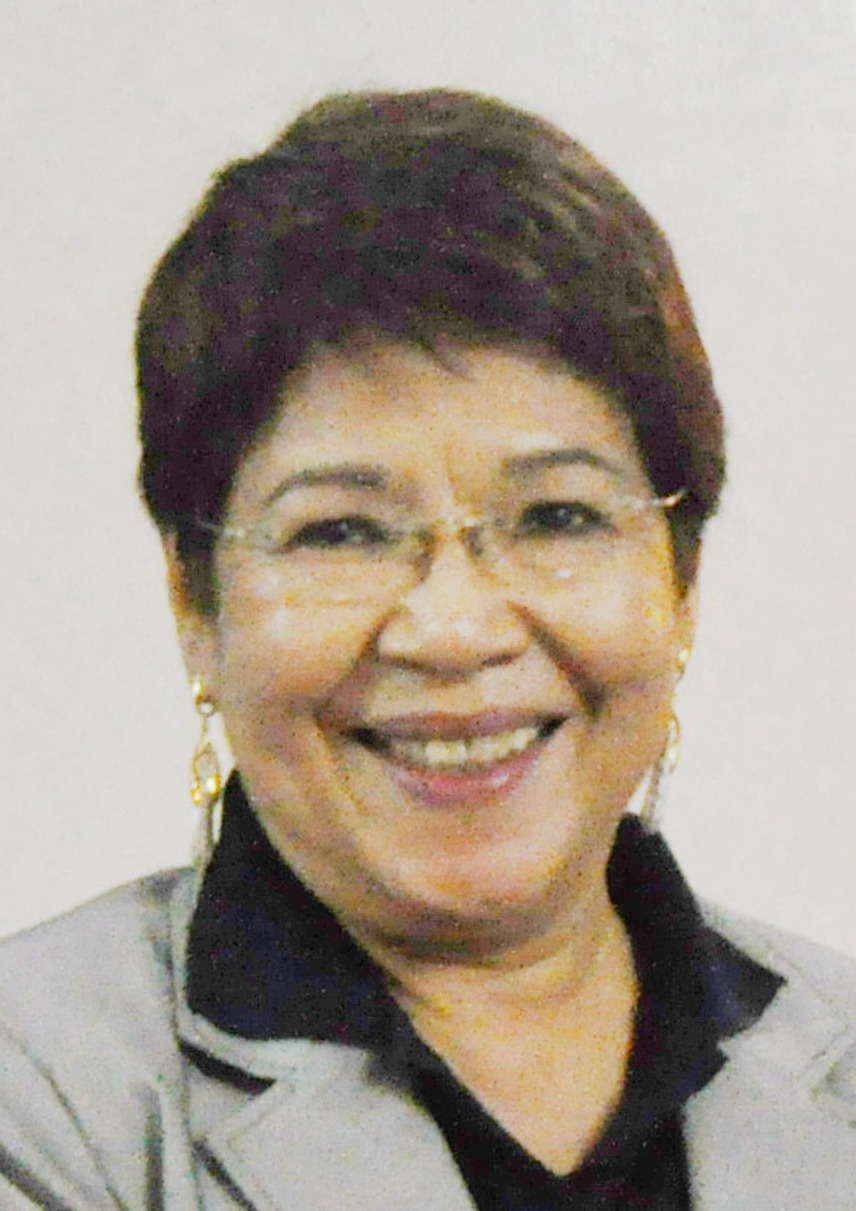
Luwalhati Antonino

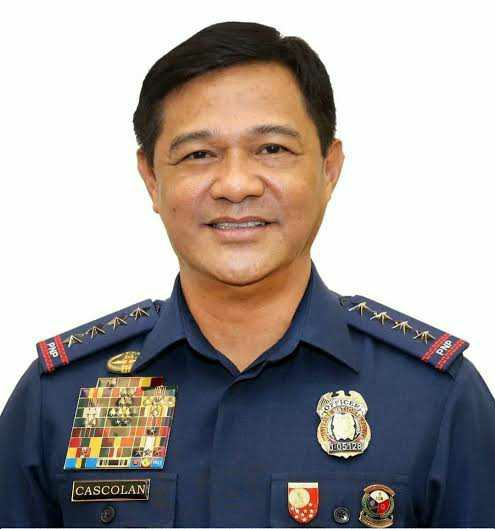
Camilo Cascolan

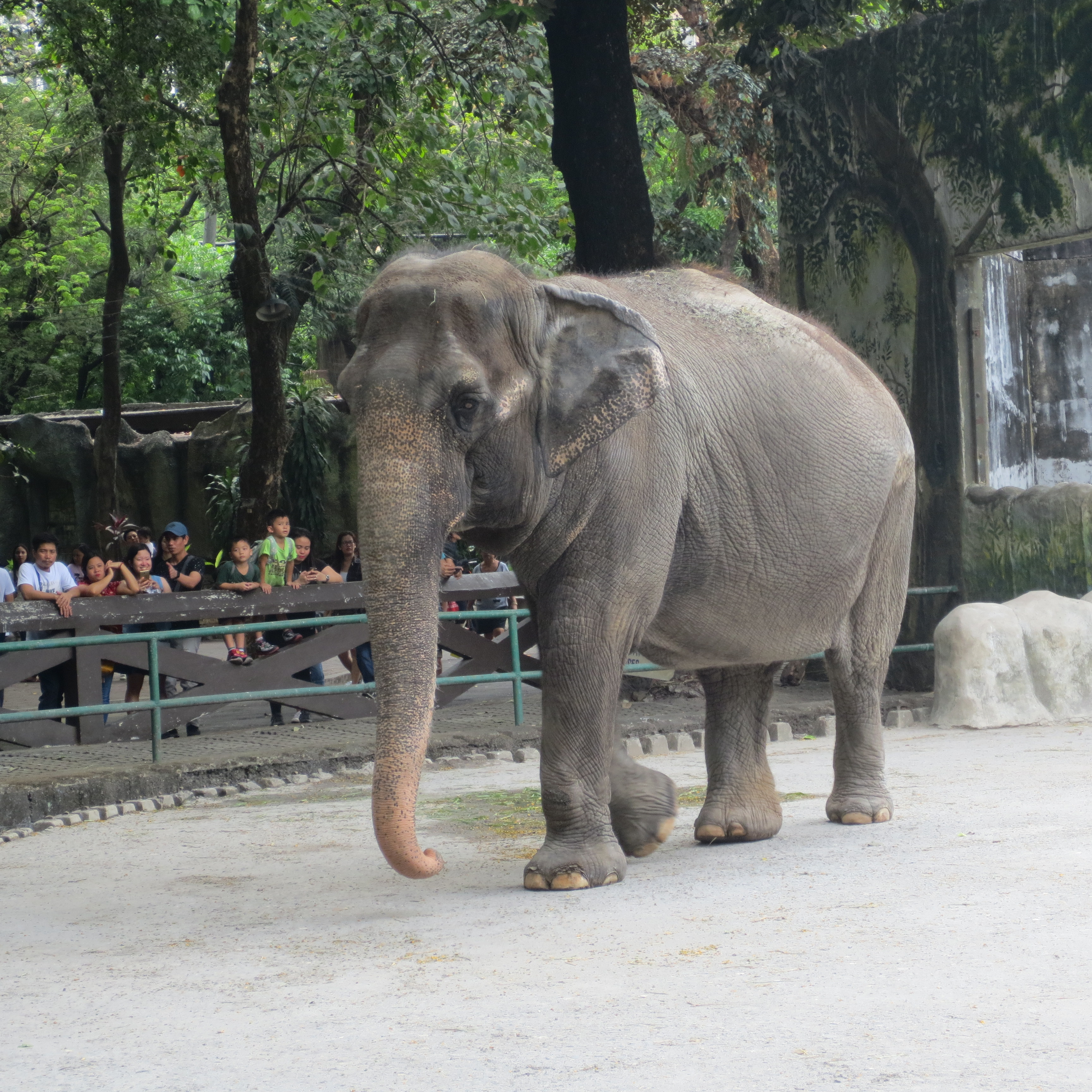
Mali

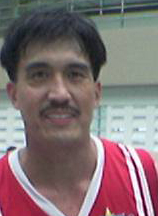
Samboy Lim

=== January ===
- January 6 – Benjamin Almoneda (b. 1930), Roman Catholic prelate, auxiliary bishop (1990–1991) and bishop (1991–2007) of Daet
- January 18 – Catalino Arevalo (b. 1925), Jesuit priest and theologian

=== February ===
- February 1:
  - Angel Alcala (b. 1929), biologist, Secretary of Environment and Natural Resources (1992-1995), Chair of the Commission on Higher Education (1995-1999), and national scientist
  - Terry Saldaña (b. 1958), basketball player
- February 4 – Roberto Ongpin (b. 1939), businessman and Minister of Commerce and Industry (1979-1986)
- February 5 – Khalipha Nando (b. 1940/1941), first Wa'lī of Bangsamoro (since 2019) and co-founder of the Moro Islamic Liberation Front
- February 12 – Lualhati Bautista (b. 1945), writer and novelist

=== March ===
- March 1 – Boybits Victoria (b. 1971), basketball player
- March 4 – Roel Degamo (b. 1966), governor of Negros Oriental (2011-June 2022 and since October 2022)
- March 8 – Jose David Lapuz (b. 1938), educator, cultural administrator and former Presidential Consultant for Education and International Organization
- March 11 – Angel Hobayan (b. 1929), bishop emeritus of the Diocese of Catarman (1974-2005)
- March 16 – Victor Ocampo (b. 1952), bishop of Gumaca (since 2015)
- March 26 – Jaime Tadeo (b. 1938), peasant leader and member of the 1986 Constitutional Commission

=== April ===
- April 18 – Albert del Rosario (b. 1939), Secretary of Foreign Affairs (2011–2016) and ambassador to the United States (2001–2006)
- April 19 – Ed Picson (b. 1953), president and chief executive officer of the Association of Boxing Alliances in the Philippines

=== May ===
- May 5 – Carlos Padilla (b. 1944), governor (since 2016) and representative (1987-1992, 1995-2004, 2007–2016) of Nueva Vizcaya
- May 31 – Ramon Farolan (b. 1934), Commissioner of the Bureau of Customs (1977-1986) and Commanding General of the Philippine Air Force (1986)

=== June ===
- June 3 – John Regala (b. 1965), actor
- June 12 – Rodolfo Biazon (b. 1935), senator (1992–1995, 1998–2010), representative of Muntinlupa (2010-2016) and Chief of Staff of the Armed Forces of the Philippines (1991)
- June 15 – Patrick Guzman (b. 1967), actor
- June 18 – Christian Espiritu (b. 1934), fashion designer
- June 28 – Corazon Nuñez Malanyaon (b. 1949), governor (2007–2016 and since 2022) and representative (2001-2007 and 2016-2022) of Davao Oriental

=== July ===
- July 3 – Abuhuraira Udasan (b. 1942), Grand Mufti of Bangsamoro (since 2019)
- July 5 – Mario Dumaual (b. 1958), entertainment journalist
- July 7 – Amando Doronila (b. 1928), journalist
- July 16 – Ricky Rivero (b. 1972), actor and director
- July 26 – Willie Nepomuceno (b. 1948), comedian and impersonator

=== August ===
- August 8 – Martin Diño (b. 1957), former undersecretary of the Interior and Local Government (2018-2022) and chair of the Subic Bay Metropolitan Authority (2016-2017)
- August 10 – Robert Arevalo (b. 1938), actor
- August 13 – Danny Lacuna (b. 1938), vice mayor of Manila (1970-1971, 1988-1992 and 1998-2007)
- August 17 – Angie Ferro (b. 1937), actress
- August 22 – Susan Ople (b. 1962), Secretary of Migrant Workers (since 2022)
- August 29 – Mike Enriquez (b. 1951), broadcaster

=== September ===
- September 21 – Pedro Pancho (b. 1934), representative of the 2nd district of Bulacan (1992-2001, 2004-2013)
- September 22 – Bayani Fernando (b. 1946), MMDA chairperson (2002–2009), Secretary of Public Works and Highways (2003), and representative (2016-2022) and mayor of Marikina, Metro Manila (1992–2001)

=== October ===
- October 3 – Edward Hagedorn (b. 1946), representative of the 3rd district of Palawan (since 2022) and mayor of Puerto Princesa (1992–2001, 2002–2013)
- October 18 – Jaymee Joaquin (b. 1979), actress and TV host
- October 29 – Joey Paras (b. 1978), comedian and film director
- October 30 – Luwalhati Antonino (b. 1943), representative of the 1st District of South Cotabato (1992–2001) and chairperson of the Mindanao Development Authority (2010–2016).

=== November ===
- November 5:
  - Ato Tolentino (b. 1947), basketball player and college coach
  - Juan Jumalon (b. 1966), broadcaster
- November 6 – Conrado de Quiros (b. 1951), journalist
- November 12 – Rina Jimenez-David (b. 1955), journalist
- November 22 – Antonio Genato (b. 1929), basketball player
- November 24 – Camilo Cascolan (b. 1964), chief of the Philippine National Police (2020)
- November 28 – Mali (b. 1974), lone Sri Lankan-born Asian elephant at Manila Zoo

=== December ===
- December 1 – Manolo Favis (b. 1939), radio personality
- December 2 – Jun Urbano (b. 1939), comedian and director
- December 17 – Ronaldo Valdez (b. 1947), actor
- December 21 – Josefa Saniel (b. 1925), former dean of the University of the Philippines Asian Center
- December 23 – Samboy Lim (b. 1962), basketball player

== See also ==
=== Country overviews ===
- Government of the Philippines
- History of the Philippines
- History of the Philippines (1986–present)
- Outline of the Philippines
- Politics of the Philippines
- Timeline of Philippine history
- List of years in the Philippines

=== Related timelines for current period ===
- 2023
- 2023 in politics and government
- 2020s
