= Grand Mufti of Region IX and Palawan =

Sunni clerical office in southern Philippines

- المفتي العام لإقليم التاسع وبلاوان
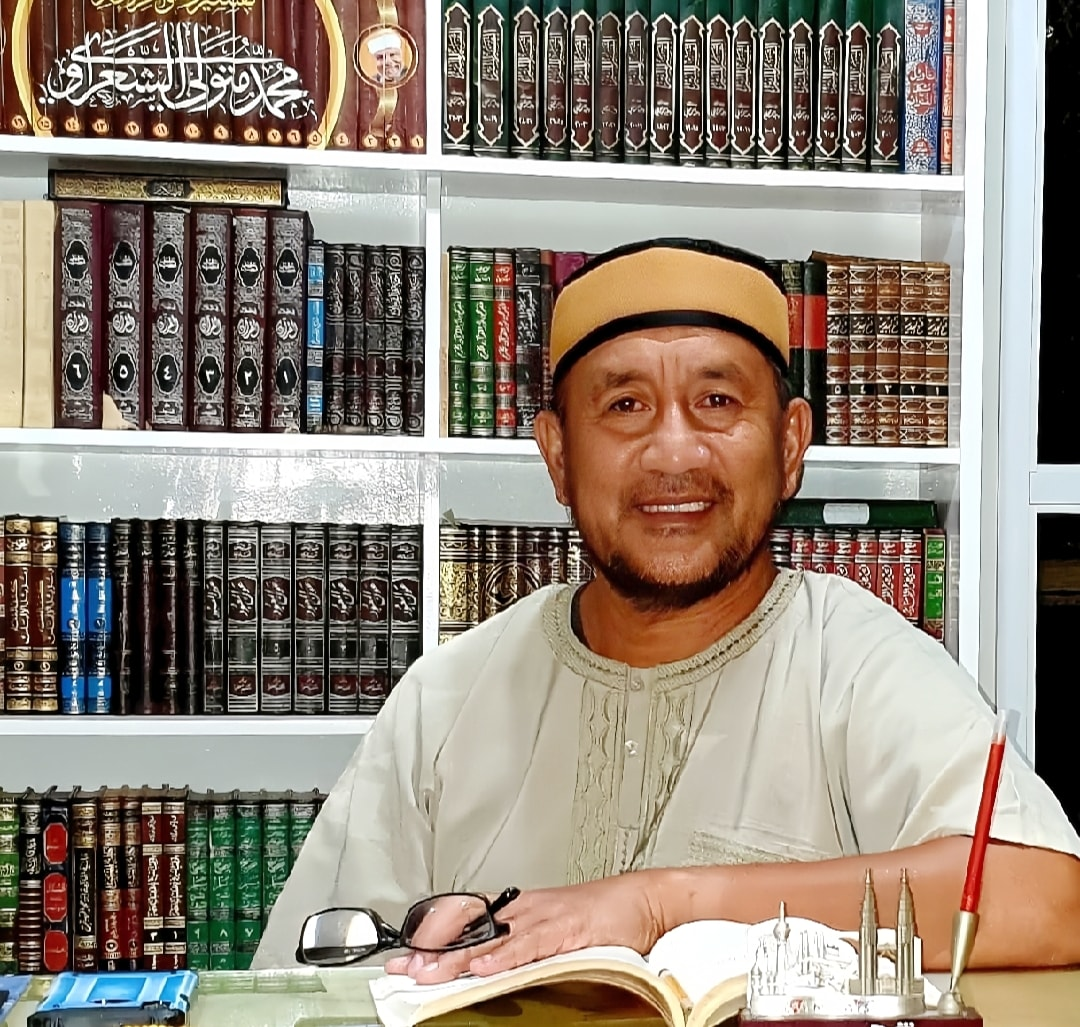
- Incumbent; Walid Abubakar since October 10, 2025
- Darul Ifta' Region XI and Palawan
- Style: Grand Mufti; Sheikh
- Type: Religious leadership, advisory
- Status: Grand Mufti of Region XI and Palawan
- Appointer: Southern Philippines Council for Peace and Development
- Formation: 1989
- First holder: Abdulgani Yusop

The Grand Mufti of Region IX and Palawan (Arabic: المفتي العام لإقليم التاسع وبلاوان) is the highest Sunni juristic and religious authority in the Zamboanga Peninsula and the province of Palawan, Philippines. The office oversees the issuing of fatāwā (legal opinions), provides Islamic guidance on matters of law and faith, and serves as a moral and spiritual advisor to Muslim communities within western Mindanao.

The institution operates under the Darul Ifta', the official Islamic advisory council recognized in the Final Peace Agreement on the Implementation of the 1976 Tripoli Agreement between the Government of the Republic of the Philippines and the Moro National Liberation Front (MNLF).

== History ==
The Darul Ifta'–Region IX and Palawan (Islamic Advisory Council) was formally institutionalized under the Final Peace Agreement on the Implementation of the 1976 Tripoli Agreement, signed on September 2, 1996, between the Government of the Republic of the Philippines (GRP) and the Moro National Liberation Front (MNLF). The agreement established the Southern Philippines Council for Peace and Development (SPCPD) and mandated that "The SPCPD shall be assisted by the Darul Iftah (Advisory Council) which shall be created by the Chairman of the SPCPD."

The same article defined the Special Zone of Peace and Development (SZOPAD), including Zamboanga Peninsula and Palawan, as the SPCPD's jurisdiction. Consequently, the Darul Ifta' of Region IX and Palawan operates as the regional realization of this provision, headed by the Grand Mufti, who provides Islamic legal and moral guidance across Western Mindanao and Palawan. Its main office is located within the Hji Ahmad Sakaluran Grand Mosque in Barangay Kasanyangan, Zamboanga City.

The Grand Muftiship upholds and represents this classical Sunni tradition, serving as both a juristic authority and a moral guide for Muslim communities across Western Mindanao and Palawan. Its leadership plays a vital role in preserving the authenticity of traditional Islam while safeguarding Bangsamoro culture and heritage.

Since the arrival of Islam in the southern Philippines in the 14th century, the majority of Filipino Muslims, particularly in the ZAMBASULTA area (Zamboanga Peninsula, Basilan, Sulu, and Tawi-Tawi), have followed Ahlus-Sunnah wal-Jamā'ah, adhering to the Ashʿarī creed in theology (ʿAqīdah), the Shāfiʿī school of jurisprudence (Fiqh), and the Sufi path of spiritual purification (Tasawwuf). Many also continue to practice the indigenous spiritual discipline known as ʿIlmu Kamaasan, a localized expression of Islamic ethics, moral excellence, and inner refinement.

== Role and functions ==
The Grand Mufti:

- Heads the Darul Ifta', a council of ʿUlamāʾ that issues fatāwā (Islamic legal opinions)
- Serves as chief Islamic legal authority for Region IX and Palawan
- Advises the Southern Philippines Council for Peace and Development (SPCPD) on religious and ethical matters
- Promotes Wasatiyyah (Islamic moderation), unity, and peaceful coexistence among Muslims and non-Muslims
- Oversees the training and accreditation of local Imāms and Muftīs under the Darul Ifta' framework.

== Legal recognition ==
The Final Peace Agreement on the Implementation of the 1976 Tripoli Agreement (1996) explicitly recognized the creation of a Darul Iftah as part of the peace and governance architecture of Southern Philippines, stating: "The SPCPD shall be assisted by the Darul Iftah (advisory council), which shall be created by the Chairman of the SPCPD."

This clause formally institutionalized the religious advisory role of Islamic scholars within a national peace accord, a first in Philippine history.

== List of Grand Muftis ==
- Al-Ustadz AbdulGani L. Yusop Al-Azhari (1989–1997): Founder of the Darul Ifta' in Southern Philippines; graduate of the Faculty of Usuluddin, majoring in Aqidah and Philosophy at Al-Azhar University; Ash'ari in creed, Shafi'i in Fiqh, and Sufi; peace mediator and advocate of interfaith dialogue.
- Al-Ustadz Abdulbaki Abubakar Al-Azhari (1997–2025): Graduate of the Faculty of Arabic Language, Department of History and Civilization, Al-Azhar University; scholar of Arabic, history, and Shariʿa; also Secretary-General for Foreign Affairs of the MNLF; Ash'ari in creed, Shafi'i in Fiqh; contributed to advanced Islamic education and diplomacy in the Bangsamoro.
- Al-Ustadz Walid Abubakar Ad-Dimasqī (2025–present): Graduate of Damascus University (Islamic Law – Shariʿa); Ash'ari in creed, Shafi'i in Fiqh; endorsed by the Ulama Supreme Council of Zamboanga Peninsula, MNLF, and local Islamic institutions.

#	Portrait	Name	
#	Portrait	Name	Term
1		Abdulgani Yusop	1989–1997
2		AbdulBaki Abubakar	1997–2025
3		Walid Abubakar	2025–present

=== Muftis under the Darul Iftah of Region IX and Palawan ===
As of October 2025, the following regional Muftis serve under the Grand Mufti of Region IX and Palawan, Shaykh Walid Abubakar, according to the official ceremonial presentation held at the Palacio del Sur, Marcian Garden Hotel, Zamboanga City:

- Al-Ustadz Abdulwakil Tanjilil – Deputy Mufti of Region IX and Palawan
- Al-Ustadz Abdennaser Abdurahman – Mufti of Zamboanga City
- Al-Ustadz Abdulmujib Arip – Mufti of Zamboanga Sibugay
- Al-Ustadz Abdulwadud Musa – Mufti of Zamboanga del Norte

This structure forms part of the Darul Ifta' council's regional leadership in Western Mindanao and Palawan, recognized during the 2025 ceremonial presentation.

== Endorsements and recognition ==
The appointment of Sheikh Walid Abubakar as Grand Mufti has been officially supported by:

- MNLF
- National Commission on Muslim Filipinos (NCMF) Secretary Hon. Sabuddin N. Abdurahim
- The Provincial Government of Tawi-Tawi
- The Ulama Supreme Council of Zamboanga Peninsula
- The Sabiel Al-Mohtadeen Foundation Inc., under Shaykh Khadraji "Guru Bata" Tapsi
- The Naqshbandi Tariqa under Shaykh Khalid Ismael
- The Palawan Muslim Consultative and Da'wah Council (PMCDC)
- The Royal Sultanate of Sulu, represented by Sultan Muedzul Lail Tan Kiram, one of the recognized claimants to the historic Sultanate of Sulu and North Borneo.
- The Sunni Tijani Naqib al-ashraf of the Philippines, Dr. Calingalan Hussin Caluang
- Ulama Council of Zamboanga Peninsula (but later, they removed it from their page)

== See also ==
- Sufism in the Philippines
- Islam in the Philippines
- Code of Muslim Personal Laws
- Zamboanga City
- Bangsamoro Darul Ifta'

== Sources ==
- The Final Peace Agreement on the Implementation of the 1976 Tripoli Agreement Between the GRP and the MNLF. Government of the Republic of the Philippines and the Moro National Liberation Front. 1996. pp. 9–10.
- Prof. Ali T. Yacub, Remembering the Grand Mufti AbdulGani L. Yusop Al-Azhari, Golden Crescent Consortium, 2016.
- Moro National Liberation Front – Official Statements, 2024.
- Provincial Government of Tawi-Tawi, Official Endorsement, 2024.
