= Maguing ambush =

2023 attack in the Philippines

- Location: Highway in Barangay Delimbayan, Lanao del Sur, Philippines
- Date: February 17, 2023; 4pm
- Target: Mamintal Adiong Jr.
- Weapons: M14 rifle and M16 rifle
- Deaths: 4 (3 policemen, 1 driver)
- Injuries: 2 (including Adiong Jr.)
- Perpetrators: Lomalo Baratamo Mandoc, Oscar Tacmal Capal Gandiwali and supporters

On February 17, 2023, Maute group financier and sympathizer Oscar Gandawali along with gang members led by Lomala Baratamo Mandoc ambushed Lanao del Sur governor Mamintal Adiong Jr. in the town of Maguing, Philippines in an attempt to assassinate him. While Adiong Jr. and another staff member were injured in the assassination attempt, three police officers and a driver escorting his convoy were killed.

== Background ==
Maguing is located in an area of the Philippines that was once controlled by the Moro Islamic Liberation Front (MILF), an Islamist militant group based in Bangsamoro. When MILF signed a permanent ceasefire with the Philippine government in 2014, many of its supporters defected to the Islamic State-affiliated Abu Sayyaf or created their own Islamist gangs. Oscar Tacmar Capal Gandawali was a gang leader in the Lanao del Sur area who financed Islamic State groups in the area and conducted gun-running operations and was involved in the drug trade. In October 2018, Gandawali planned an ambush that killed five Philippine Drug Enforcement Agency (PDEA) officers. At the time of the ambush in Maguing, Gandawali was considered by Philippine authorities the most wanted man in Lanao del Sur and the fourth most wanted in Bangsamoro.

== Ambush ==
On February 17, Adiong Jr. and his staff were leaving a meeting in Maguing and being escorted by policemen to Wao. At around 4pm in barangay Delimbayan, the convoy was ambushed by Gandawali and his supporters from a roadside ditch, killing four policemen and injuring Adiong Jr. and his staff member Ali Macapado Tabao. The perpetrators had been set up in the ditch with M14 and M16 rifles. The perpetrators of the ambush fled before more police could arrive on scene, and their identities were unknown in the days following the ambush. Representative of Lanao del Sur's 1st district Zia Alonto Adiong, the younger brother of Mamintal Adiong Jr., stated on the evening of February 17 that his brother, Tabao, and another injured person were both rushed to the hospital in Cagayan de Oro with gunshot injuries, and both were in stable condition. Adiong Jr. had to receive surgery to remove a bullet from his right hip, and the surgery was successful. Alonto Adiong also stated that the police officers killed were relatives of him and the governor. The policemen killed were Staff Sgt. Mohammed Jurai Mipnga Adiong, Cpl. Johanie Lawi Sumandar, and Cpl. Jalil Ampuan Cosain; the driver was Hassanor Pundaodaya.

On the evening of the ambush, Lanao del Sur police chased and eventually killed a suspect in the ambush named Alyas Otin. Otin was a supporter of Gandawali's gang.

== Aftermath ==
By February 22, the Lanao del Sur police had identified ten suspects involved in the ambush, but only named Gandawali and Kumander Lumala. The police called on the suspects to surrender to the authorities peacefully. The Philippine police stated several suspects had connections with a gang led by Lomala Baratamo Mandoc, and three suspects in Mandoc's gang were arrested on March 10. Five days prior on March 5, Mandoc, Gandawali, and an Acsanie Hadji Salic were named the most wanted perpetrators. On March 30, another suspect had been identified and killed by Philippine police in a firefight in Delimbayan. Philippine police announced on May 4 that Gandawali had been killed after Philippine police found his location and attempted to arrest him. A firefight ensued, and Gandawali was killed while many of his fellow gang members fled. Two police officers were also killed in the firefight. While Philippine media had dubbed Gandiwali as the mastermind of the ambush on Adiong Jr., Philippine police stated on May 10 that Gandiwali was just the right-hand man; Mandoc was the ringleader. By that time, Mandoc was the last of the perpetrators to have not been arrested or killed by Philippine authorities. Mandoc was caught and arrested in Surallah, South Cotabato on May 25.
