= Jose David Lapuz =

UNESCO commissioner (1938–2023)

José David Lápuz
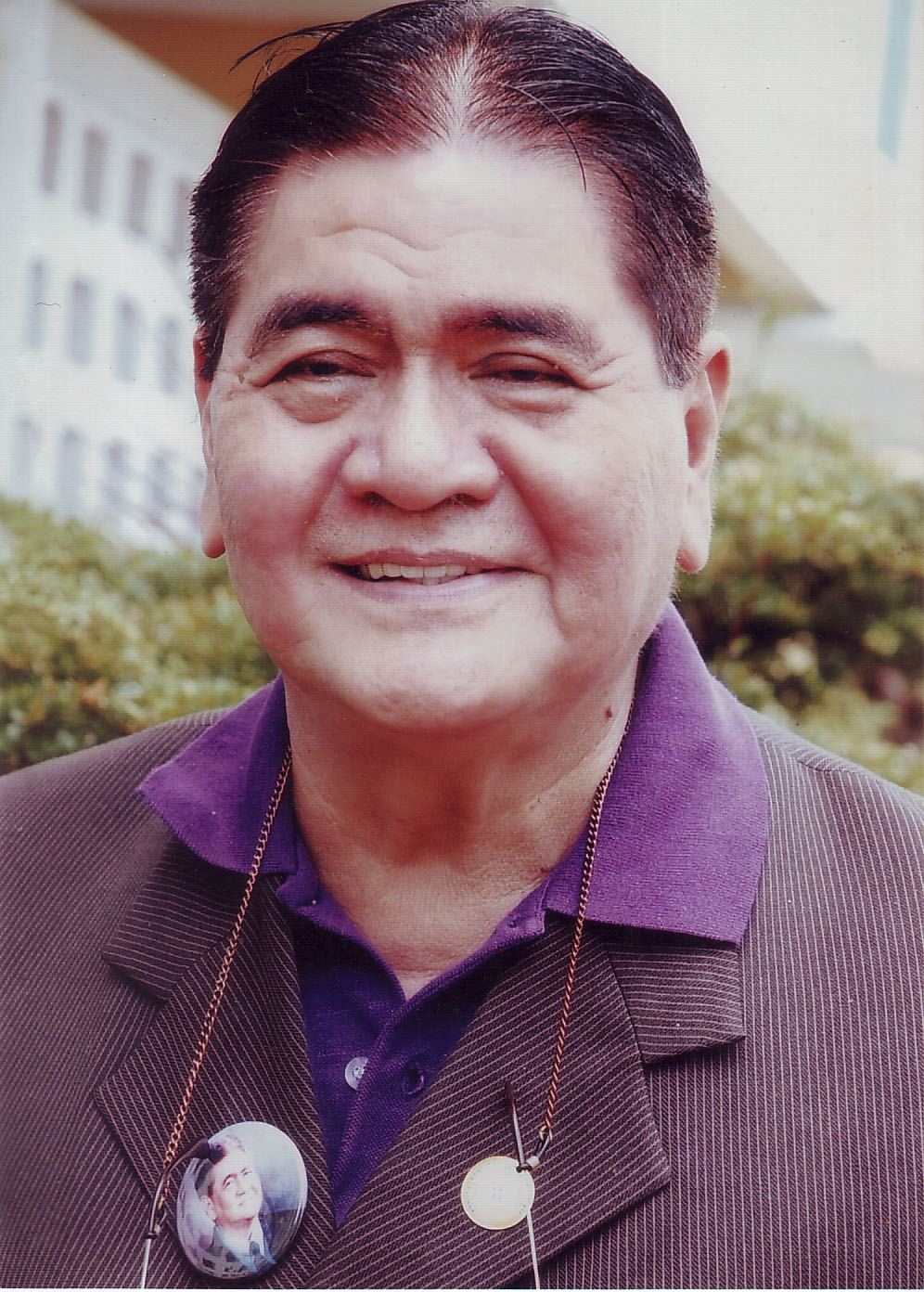

Presidential Consultant for Education and International Organization
- In office 6 March 2017 – 30 June 2022
- Appointed by: Rodrigo Duterte
- Preceded by: Position established
- Succeeded by: Position abolished

Chairman of the UNESCO National Commission of the Philippines
- In office 1999–2005
- Appointed by: Joseph Estrada; Gloria Macapagal Arroyo

Member of the National Historical Commission of the Philippines
- In office 2009–2010
- Appointed by: Gloria Macapagal Arroyo; Benigno Aquino III

Personal details
- Born: José David Lápuz; 19 April 1938
- Died: 8 March 2023 (aged 84)
- Education: University of the Philippines (BA); University of Glasgow (MA)
- Occupation: Educator; Cultural administrator

José David Lápuz (19 April 1938 – 8 March 2023) was a Filipino educator and cultural administrator. Lapuz previously served as one of the commissioners of the UNESCO National Commission of the Philippines (UNACOM) and was a member of the UNESCO Advisory Committee on Human Rights and Poverty based in Paris. He previously worked as a lecturer in international relations and political science at the Polytechnic University of the Philippines until his death in 2023.

== Career ==
Lapuz received his bachelor's degree at the University of the Philippines and his post-graduate studies in International Politics and Foreign Policy at the University of Glasgow in Scotland. He started teaching at the University of Santo Tomas in 1970.

Lapuz attended and read papers before the Annual Conference of the Political Studies Association of the United Kingdom, the American Political Science Association in Washington, D.C. and the International Studies Association of New York. He lectured in the following schools: Eastern Washington University, Harvard, East Carolina University, UCLA, and the University of London, L.S.E., Glasgow University and Oxford University. He has also lectured at the Leningrad State University, now St. Petersburg, Russian Federation; and the then USSR Institute of Oriental Studies, Moscow. He also delivered formal lectures at the Humboldt Universitat Zu Berlin (University of Berlin) in Berlin, Germany.

In 1999, Lapuz was first appointed United Nations Educational, Scientific, and Cultural Organization (Unesco) commissioner to the Committee on Social and Human Sciences. In 2002, he was re-appointed for a further three-year term.

In March 2009, President Gloria Macapagal Arroyo appointed Lápuz as Presidential Consultant. By November 2009, he was appointed commissioner and board member of the National Historical Institute.

In March 2017, Lapuz was appointed by President Rodrigo Duterte as Presidential Consultant for Education and International Organization under the Office of the President. He was Duterte's political science professor at the Lyceum of the Philippines University in the 1960s. Earlier, in 2016, President Duterte had expressed his intent to appoint Lapuz as the Chairperson of the Commission on Higher Education. However, this was met with criticism due to plagiarism allegations committed by Lapuz, as well as questions on qualification as raised by his former students.
