= Myanmar–Philippines relations =

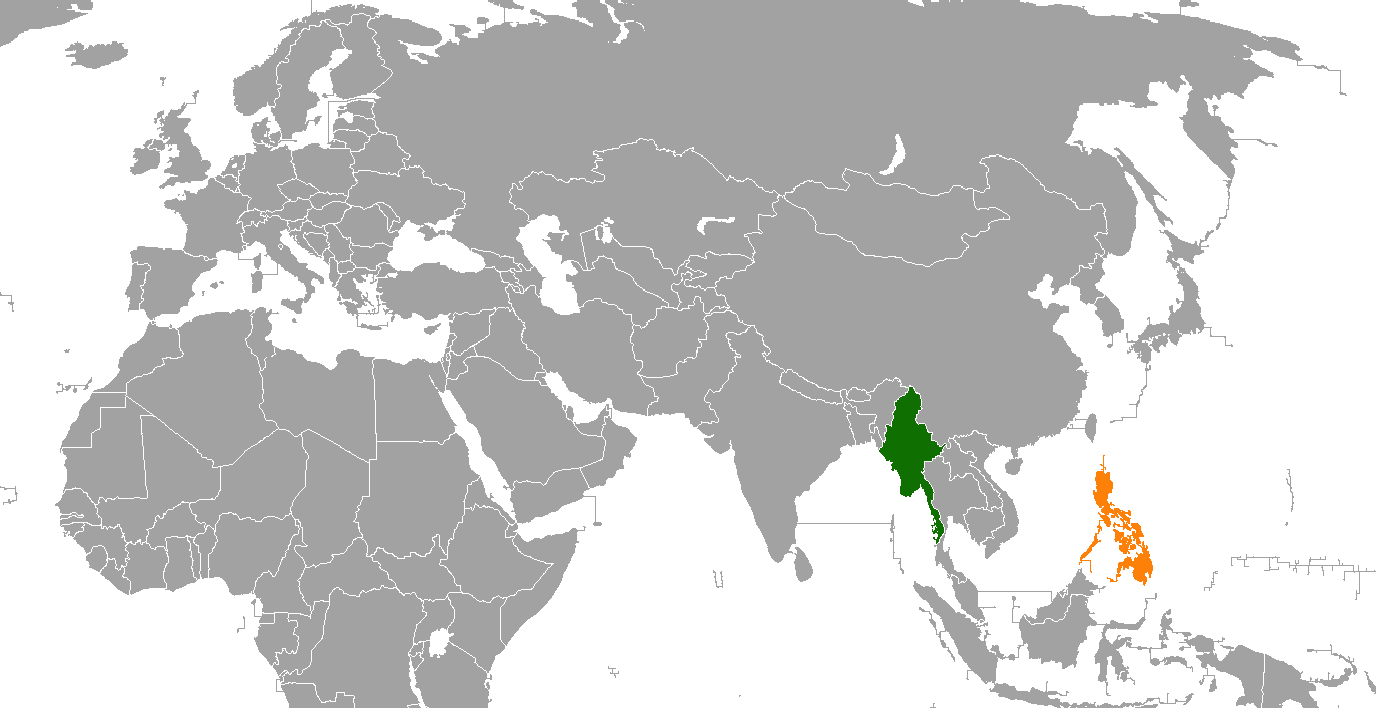

- Myanmar: Philippines

Myanmar and the Philippines are both members of the Association of Southeast Asian Nations (ASEAN). Formal bilateral and diplomatic relations of both countries established in September 1956. Myanmar has an embassy in Manila and the Philippines maintains its embassy in (Yangoon) and later Rangoon.

== Bilateral relations ==
Relations between Myanmar and the Philippines existed before the colonial era. In the 1400s-1500s, historian William Henry Scott, quoting the Portuguese manuscript Summa Orientalis, noted that Mottama in Burma (Myanmar) had a large presence of merchants from Mindanao. Likewise, during the Burmese-Siamese Wars. Burma (Myanmar) employed the military services of mercenaries from Luzon who were called Lucoes. Burmese traders also traded in the Hindu Rajahnate of Cebu in the Visayas islands at the Philippines, as they exchanged Burmese sugar for Cebuano gold.

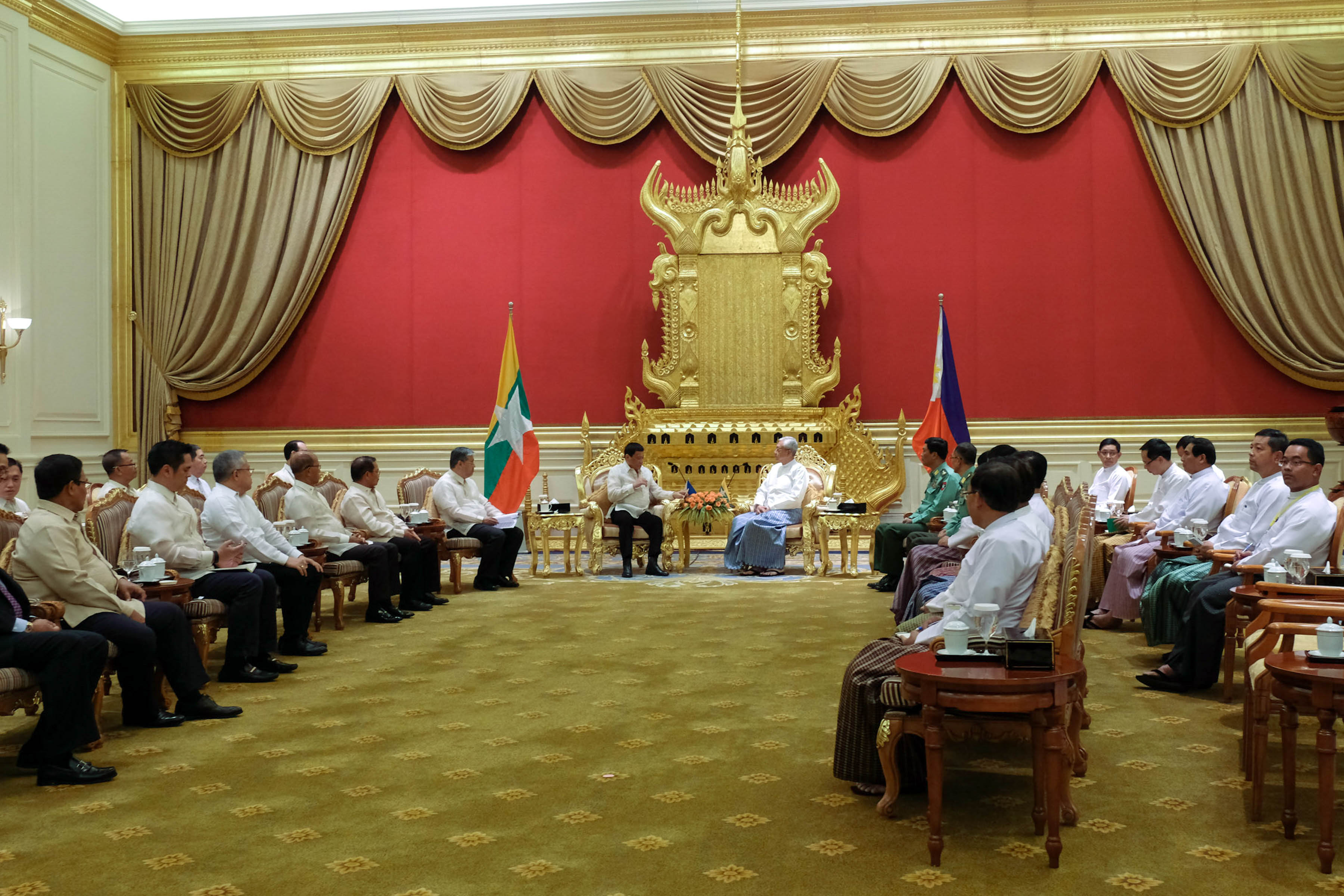
Philippine President Rodrigo Duterte and Myanmar President Htin Kyaw at the Presidential Palace in Nay Pyi Taw, Myanmar on March 20, 2017.

The Philippines was one of the Asian countries most critical of Myanmar's military junta prior to its moves toward democracy in 2011, due to similar experience between the two nations ruled under military juntas of Ne Win and Ferdinand Marcos.

Myanmar and the Philippines strengthen their ties particularly in business and economy. Vice President Jejomar Binay, representing President Benigno Aquino III. Burmese President Thein Sein at the ASEAN-India Commemorative Summit held on 2012 in New Delhi. The Philippines agreed to assist in the development of Myanmar's agriculture sector through the introduction of rice and banana technologies. In 2012, Myanmar is poised to reap real trade benefits from neighboring countries and the Philippines where a bilateral trade meeting to strengthen economic ties. Philippine Foreign Affairs Secretary Albert del Rosario meets Foreign Secretary Wunna Maung Lwin in Naypyitaw. The visit of del Rosario brought the relations of the two countries closer. The Philippines now supports the lifting of economic sanctions against Myanmar.

== Rohingya crisis ==
Regarding the Rohingya crisis, the Philippines has been open in receiving Rohingya refugees fleeing from Myanmar. Both the administration of Philippine President Benigno Aquino III and Rodrigo Duterte has pledged support to receive refugees with the latter offering to give Filipino citizenship to the Rohingya.

In 2018, Myanmar criticized Duterte's characterization of the situation as a genocide while in response the Philippines issued an apology to Myanmar leader Aung San Suu Kyi and said the relevant remark was critical to European nations criticizing the human rights situation without extending help to Myanmar. Earlier in January 2018, Duterte has advised the Myanmar leader to ignore criticism on her country's human rights situation. A joint Japanese and Filipino team of former diplomats was also formed to investigate alleged human rights violations in relation to the crisis.

Under the Duterte administration, the Philippines voted against a 2017 United Nations General Assembly resolution condemning the human rights situation in Myanmar and a 2018 United Nations Human Rights Council resolution which extended the mandate of a UN international fact finding team probing alleged human rights violations in Myanmar.

== Others ==
Philippine Foreign Affairs Albert del Rosario urged Myanmar's roadmap to democracy, which he said is crucial. Del Rosario conveyed to Myanmar's Foreign Minister Lwin appeal to free the more than 2,000 political prisoners.

From 19 to 20 January 2026, Philippine Foreign Affairs Secretary, Tess Lazaro, attended ASEAN discussions with Myanmar opposition groups, including the National Unity Government and the Chin National Front. According to Lazaro, they contributed "active, constructive and meaningful sharing of perspectives on the implementation of the ASEAN Five-Point Consensus." Lazaro also refused to endorse the 2025–26 Myanmar general election.
