= Abuhuraira Udasan =

Filipino Muslim theologian (1942–2023)

Sheikh Abuhuraira Udasan
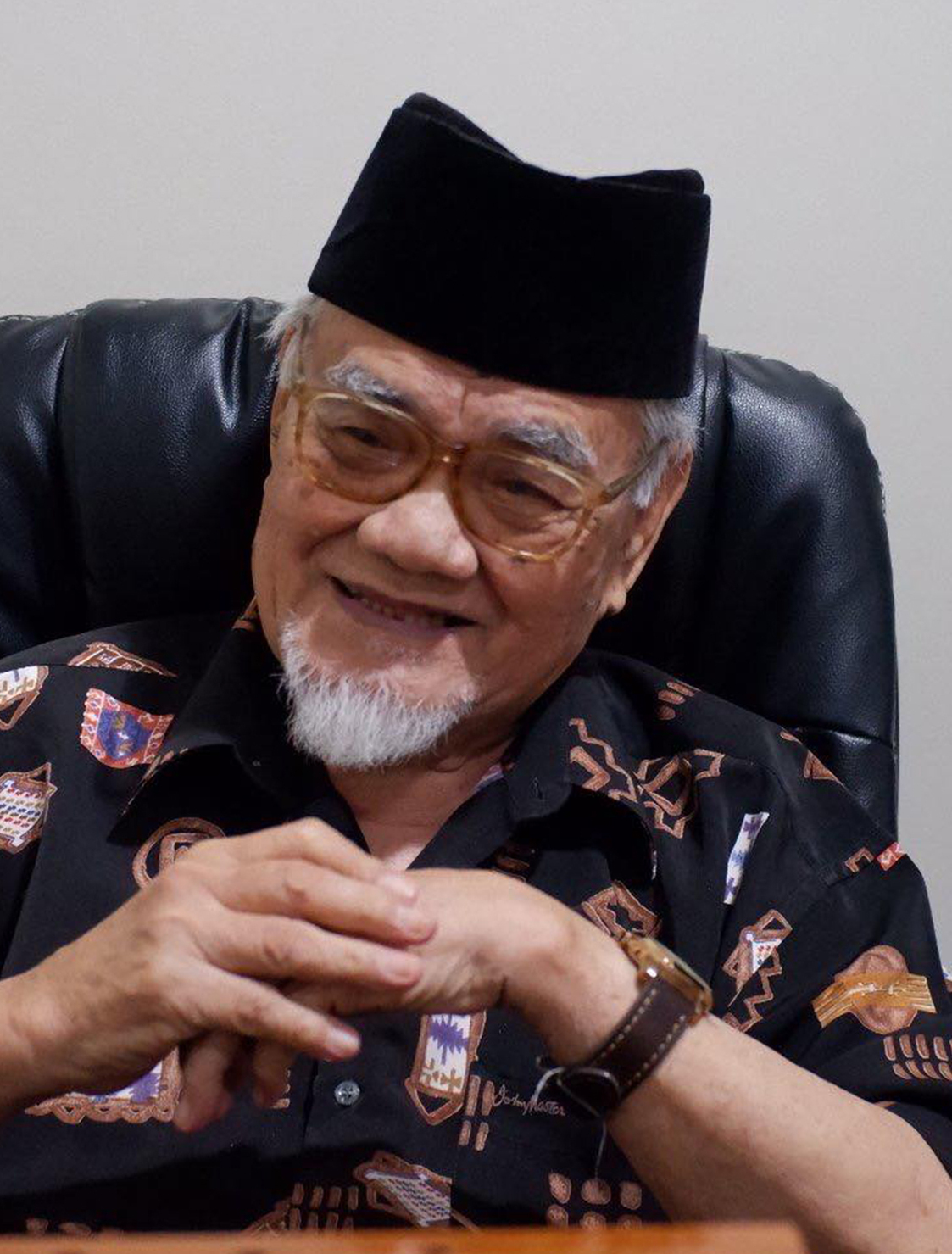

Personal life
- Born: March 3, 1942 Dulawan, Cotabato, Philippines
- Died: July 3, 2023 (aged 81) Cotabato City, Philippines

Religious life
- Religion: Islam

Muslim leader
- Post: Grand Mufti of Bangsamoro
- Period in office: Until July 3, 2023
- Predecessor: Position established
- Successor: Abdulrauf A. Guialani

Sheikh Abuhuraira Abdulrahman Udasan (March 3, 1942 – July 3, 2023) was a Filipino Muslim theologian who was the first grand mufti of the Bangsamoro Darul Ifta'.

== Early life and education ==
=== Early years ===
Abuhuraira Abdulrahman Udasan was born on March 3, 1942, in Kitango village of Dulawan, Cotabato (modern day Datu Piang, Maguindanao del Sur).

Born to Udasan Gutem Montok and Sa'Diah Sambelen Abdulrahman, Abuhuraira grew up in a religious family learning about Islam from his father. He reportedly already memorized many chapters of the Quran by the time he was six years old.

=== Basic education ===
For his elementary education Udasan attended the Kitango Primary School for years before moving to the Dulawan Central Elementary School where he finished his two remaining years. For his secondary education he attended the Cotabato High School where he studied from 1948 to 1958.

=== Religious studies ===
Udasan would start dedicating in Islamic studies when he studied at the Madrasah Rashidah (now Ma’had al-Rahmaniah) in Maganoy (now Shariff Aguak) from 1958 to 1964.

Udasan traveled abroad for further studies. In 1966, Udasan would learn about spiritual studies in comparative religion (Christian-Islam) in Jerusalem, studied at the Islamic University of Madinah in Saudi Arabia in 1971 where he obtained a bachelor's degree of Da'wah and Islamic Usuloddin (Shariah).

== Career ==
From 1971 to 1972, Udasan would be director of the Ma'had Al-Rahmaniah, an Islamic studies Arabic-language high school in Magonoy. He would start missionary work across various parts of Mindanao in 1974.

Udasan was also director of the Islamic Da'wah for the United Sabah Islamic Association in Sabah, Malaysia for 15 years.

=== Moro conflict ===
Udasan was one of the co-founders of the Moro Islamic Liberation Front (MILF). He helped recruit at least 300 fighters for the group.

=== Grand mufti ===
Udasan would become the grand mufti of the Darul Ifta' of the Autonomous Region in Muslim Mindanao (ARMM), institutionalized in 2015, which would be reorganized as the Bangsamoro Darul Ifta' in 2019.

Udasan declared the activities of violent religious extremists such as the Abu Sayyaf, the Maute group and the Islamic State of Iraq and Syria as haram and condemned the utilization of minors in armed conflict.

Udasan also released a fatwa or edict in 2015 endorsing early marriages which would be criminalized by the Philippine national government in 2022.

The Bangsamoro Darul Ifta' under his leadership also released rulings for Muslims on how to deal with the COVID-19 pandemic. This includes edicts stating that COVID-19 vaccines are halal and that taking the vaccines does not break the fast.

== Personal life and death ==
Udasan was fluent in multiple languages such as English, Filipino, Arabic, and Malay. He also had command of various Mindanaoan languages such as Maguindanaon, Maranao, Iranon, Davaonon, and Tausug.

Udasan died in his sleep on July 3, 2023, at his residence in Cotabato City. He was 81.
