= Josefa Saniel =

Filipino scholar (1925–2023)

Josefa M. Saniel (March 23, 1925 – December 21, 2023) was a Filipino scholar in the field of Filipino and Japanese history. She was the dean of the University of the Philippines Asian Center from 1980 to 1985.

== Academic career ==
Saniel got her bachelor's degree of Science in Education at the University of the Philippines in 1949, her master's degree in history from the University of Chicago in 1953 and her PhD in Far Eastern Studies from the University of Michigan in 1962.

== Death ==
Saniel died on December 21, 2023, at the age of 98.

== Works ==
- Japan and the Philippines, 1868–1898 (1963)
- Okuma Shigenobu and the Philippine 1898 Problem (1965)
- Japan and the Philippines: From Traditional to Modern Societies (1976)
