= Violence and Harassment Convention =

International Labour Organization convention

C190 Violence and Harassment Convention
Convention concerning the elimination of violence and harassment in the world of work
- Convention in force Ratifiers (Convention not yet in force)
- Signed: 21 June 2019
- Location: Geneva
- Effective: 25 June 2021
- Condition: 22 ratifications
- Parties: 27
- Ratifiers: 39
- Depositary: Director-General of the International Labour Office
- Languages: French and English

The Violence and Harassment Convention, formally the Convention concerning the elimination of violence and harassment in the world of work is a convention to "recognize the right of everyone to a world of work free from violence and harassment, including gender-based violence and harassment". It is the 190th ILO convention (code C190) and was adopted during the 108th session of the International Labour Organization.

== Ratifications ==
The convention entered into force on 25 June 2021, upon ratification of Fiji and Uruguay. As of 2026, the convention had been ratified by 55 states.

Country	Date	Status
Albania	6 May 2022	In force
Angola	11 June 2025	11 June 2026
Antigua and Barbuda	9 May 2022	In force
Argentina	23 February 2021	In force
Australia	9 June 2023	In force
Austria	11 September 2024	In force
Bahamas	30 November 2022	In force
Bangladesh	22 October 2025	22 October 2026
Barbados	1 September 2022	In force
Belgium	13 June 2023	In force
Canada	30 January 2023	In force
Central African Republic	9 June 2022	In force
Chile	12 June 2023	In force
Costa Rica	2 October 2025	2 October 2026
Cyprus	4 March 2025	4 March 2026
Denmark	6 June 2024	In force
Ecuador	19 May 2021	In force
El Salvador	7 June 2022	In force
Estonia	18 December 2024	18 December 2025
Fiji	25 June 2020	In force
Finland	7 June 2024	In force
France	12 April 2023	In force
Germany	14 June 2023	In force
Greece	30 Aug 2021	In force
Ireland	12 January 2023	In force
Italy	29 October 2021	In force
Kyrgyzstan	3 June 2024	In force
Lesotho	15 March 2023	In force
Mauritius	1 July 2021	In force
Mexico	6 July 2022	In force
Montenegro	27 February 2025	27 February 2026
Namibia	9 December 2020	In force
Nigeria	8 November 2022	In force
North Macedonia	20 October 2023	In force
Norway	6 October 2023	In force
Panama	1 November 2022	In force
Papua New Guinea	27 September 2023	In force
Peru	8 June 2022	In force
Philippines	20 February 2024	In force
Portugal	16 February 2024	In force
Republic of Moldova	19 March 2024	In force
Romania	12 June 2024	In force
Rwanda	1 November 2023	In force
San Marino	14 April 2022	In force
Somalia	8 March 2021	In force
South Africa	29 November 2021	In force
Spain	25 May 2022	In force
Sri Lanka	16 April 2026	16 April 2027
Uganda	7 August 2023	In force
United Kingdom	7 March 2022	In force
Uruguay	12 June 2020	In force
Zambia	13 December 2024	13 December 2025
