= Bangsamoro Darul Ifta' =

- Abbreviation: BDI-BARMM
- Formation: 2019; 7 years ago
- Type: Government-founded and sanctioned Islamic advisory body
- Headquarters: Blue Mosque, Cotabato City, Philippines
- Region served: Autonomous Region in Muslim Mindanao (until 2019); Bangsamoro (since 2019)
- Grand Mufti: Sheikh Abdulrauf A. Guialani
- Website: bdi.bangsamoro.gov.ph

The Bangsamoro Darul Ifta' (BDI-BARMM) is an Islamic advisory council with jurisdiction over the Bangsamoro Autonomous Region in Muslim Mindanao of the Philippines.

== History ==
The Regional Darul Ifta (RDI) of Bangsamoro was established during the existence of the Autonomous Region in Muslim Mindanao (ARMM). Then-ARMM Regional Governor Mujiv Hataman institutionalized the office of the Islamic jurisconsult in the region by issuing Executive Order No. 9, series of 2014, in September 2013. The order created a transitional office of the jurisconsult to oversee religious activities in the ARMM and the propagation of Islam. The office was temporary, with the ARMM Regional Legislative Assembly considering the establishment of a permanent jurisconsult body.

The Muslim Mindanao Autonomy Act No. 323, signed by Governor Hataman in 2015, superseded Executive Order No. 9 and formally established the Regional Darul Ifta' of the Autonomous Region in Muslim Mindanao as the Islamic religious authority responsible for issuing fatāwā (opinions on religious law) and addressing matters concerning Muslims in the region. The implementing rules and regulations (IRR) for the law took effect in March 2017.

The Islamic body continued to operate when the ARMM was succeeded by the Bangsamoro Autonomous Region in Muslim Mindanao (BARMM). In its present structure, the RDI is largely headed by scholars identified with the Salafī (Madẖalī) movement, reflecting a more reactionary approach to Islamic governance within the BARMM. Nevertheless, several traditionally trained Sunnī scholars, particularly those educated at Al-Azhar University and adhering to the Ashʿarī school of theology and Shafi'i maḏhab (school of jurisprudence), continue to serve within the council, ensuring the representation of Azhari Sunni perspectives alongside contemporary reformist views. Its counterpart in western Mindanao is the Grand Mufti of Region IX and Palawan.

== Function ==
The Darul Ifta of Bangsamoro's primary role is the promulgation and issuance of fatwa or legal opinions concerning Muslim personal laws and jurisprudence, with Article VIII, Section 20 of Republic Act No. 9054 serving as the basis for this function. Republic Act No. 9054 concerns the expansion of the Organic Act of the ARMM. The jurisconsult body also has an advisory role, serving as a consultant to the Bangsamoro regional government on matters related to Islamic law, jurisprudence, and ecclesiastical affairs, as well as a religious guide for the region's politicians, government employees, and professionals.

== Structure ==
The Muslim Mindanao Autonomy Act No. 323 mandates the establishment of provincial offices in the then-extant ARMM, each of which is to be headed by a provincial mufti selected from among the resident Ulama of the relevant province.

== Grand muftis ==
- Abuhuraira Udasan (until 2023)
- Abdulrauf A. Guialani (2023–present)
