= Kapa-Community Ministry International =

Financial investment fraud scandal

The Kapa-Community Ministry International (Cebuano: Kabus Padatuon, lit. 'enrich the poor'; a.k.a. Kapa) was one of the biggest financial investment fraud scandals in Philippine history. An estimated five million people were duped by the religious company Kapa-Community Ministry International, which promised a 30% monthly return on investments for life. Kapa started in 2016 as Kapa Coop Convenience Store and General Merchandise in the city of Bislig, founded by Pastor Joel Apolinario with partnership of Noel's Investment Branch. The City Economic Enterprise Department (CEED) shut down the business for failing to comply with some provisions. In August 2017, Joel Apolinatrio was charged with 102 cases for not settling claims; 27 arrest warrants were issued. However, all the cases were dismissed with the complainants compensated. Apolinario's company moved south, becoming Kapa-Community Ministry International. The company enlisted new recruits, who became member-donors and in turn recruited new members. On June 8, 2019, Philippine President Rodrigo Duterte ordered the corporation to be shut down over the scheme.

== Background ==
The founder of Kapa, Joel Apolinario, formerly worked as a DJ and technician at a radio station in Bislig, Surigao del Sur, for ten years. In the same city, he started an investment firm that provided funding to poor people. According to members of Kapa, Apolinario is a native from Hinatuan, Surigao del Sur, where he lived as a fisherman and a construction worker in his early life. Since then, people started to send donations to Apolinario. When numerous people began donating, Apolinario resigned from his position at a radio station and rented a small space at a feeds store, where he resumed his business. In September 2016, he obtained a business permit from the local government of Bislig to establish a company named "Kapa-Co Convenience Store and General Merchandise". He renamed the establishment to "Kapa-Community Ministry International Inc." in March 2017. In February 2017, the local government discovered that the establishment promised 30% interest per month to those who received "blessings" from donations. Apolinario and his family then moved to the city of General Santos, leaving their house to be temporarily occupied by a friend. Some Kapa members claimed that because of the blessings, their businesses flourished. Conversely, a friend of Apolinario's claimed that he never received a full refund of his donation after Apolinario moved to General Santos; he was one of the first people to file charges against Apolinario for fraud. Kapa was reported to have 10,000 members in the province of Davao del Norte alone.

== Events ==
The Securities and Exchange Commission (SEC) filed criminal charges against Kapa-Community Ministry International and its executives, citing an investment scam. President Rodrigo Duterte was the first government official to announce the legal actions, doing so on June 8, 2019, when he ordered the National Bureau of Investigation (NBI) to shut down Kapa. Duterte said that the company was "clearly a form of 'syndicated estafa [fraud].'" Kapa claimed that it helped millions of Filipino people raise money, promising to donors that they would "be receiving 30% of the amount for life." A criminal investigation revealed that members would have to donate at least 10000 Philippine pesos (₱; US$198) to receive the promised return.

On June 10, the NBI raided the home of Apolinario in General Santos while he was absent. It also raided 14 branches of Kapa with a warrant issued by the Manila Regional Trial Court (RTC) Branch 20. The Court of Appeals (CA) had already frozen the bank accounts and assets of Kapa due to the suspected scheme. On June 14, the Department of Justice (DOJ) issued an immigration lookout against 15 members of Kapa including Apolinario.

On June 13, a certain Xian Gaza exposed that Apolinario would escape the country with no plans of returning.

On June 16, the SEC announced that over ₱100 million (US$1983981) worth of assets were linked to Kapa. The SEC cited public records that showed at least nine luxury cars, other sports utility vehicles, and still other properties were registered under Kapa and its executives. It also revealed that Kapa members were promised to receive a "love gift" as the interest. The SEC estimated that Kapa had invested about ₱50 billion (US$991990278) from donations from its members over the last three years. Shutting down Kapa resulted in a reduction in the income of sari-sari store (similar to a general convenience store) owners, who operated outside the Kapa headquarters. Prior to the shutdown, Apolinario had transferred Kapa's headquarters to Alabel, Sarangani.

On June 21, a video message posted by Apolinario stated that "he also asked the government to help Kapa return the money to its members" after the Anti-Money Laundering Council (AMLC) froze the company's accounts. On the same day, Rhema International Livelihood Foundation, an alleged donor of Kapa that had been involved in an Ponzi scheme, petitioned the Supreme Court to have Duterte submitted for impeachment proceedings because he shut down Kapa. In addition, the petition urged the removal from office of SEC Chairman Emilio Aquino.

On July 21, 2020, after more than six months of hiding, Apolinario and 23 of his companions were arrested by the police on an island in Lingig, Surigao del Sur after a shootout in which two of his bodyguards were killed. The police were serving the arrest and search warrants issued by the Bislig RTC. Several firearms were confiscated from Apolinario's group, including automatic rifles, a machine gun, a sniper rifle, and two rocket-propelled grenades.

In June 2023, the Supreme Court Second Division found Oscar Noel Jr., judge of General Santos RTC Branch 35, guilty of gross ignorance of the law in an administrative complaint filed by SEC; regarding his issuance in 2019 of orders preventing SEC to implement a cease and desist order against Kapa. Citing Republic Act No. 11232 (Revised Corporation Code of the Philippines), the RTC has nothing to do with the case. The judge, had been committed such violations thrice, was eventually suspended for two years.

On December 12, 2023, Butuan RTC Branch 33 convicted Apolinario and incorporators Cristobal Baradad and Joji Jusay of eight counts of syndicated estafa in relation to their Ponzi (investment) scheme; sentencing them to life imprisonment; and ordering them as well to pay ₱195,000 in damages to the complainants. The decision was announced by SEC on December 21. The case is considered as the largest investment scam in country's history.

In August 2024, the 7th Municipal Circuit Trial Court Liloan-Compostela, Cebu convicted Apolinario and KAPA’s Christopher D. Abad of estafa under Article 315, paragraph 2(a), Revised Penal Code. Aside from the imposed one year and one day imprisonment, the court ordered him to indemnify complainant Kenneth A. Gabuya ₱500,000 actual damages.

== Reactions ==
Kapa community members had asked President Duterte to reconsider his decision to close the organization. On June 13, about 50,000 Kapa members attended the prayer rally held in Acharon Sports Complex at General Santos in support of Apolinario. He later arrived in a helicopter and told the crowd that Duterte "already assured him that Kapa would continue to operate as long as it complied with government regulations." Despite being faced with controversy, Apolinario and the crowd continued to support President Duterte and his family by chanting. On June 20, members of Kapa held a rally in different areas in the country, urging President Duterte to re-open the establishment. The group also added that they had "helped the poor and the Lumad." On the same day, Kapa members had been reluctant to file complaints against Apolinario, stating that they did not "want to antagonize" Kapa officials and bite "the hands that [fed] them." A report states that some Kapa members had urged Pastor Joel Apolinario to run in the 2022 Philippine presidential election.

== See also ==
- Aman Futures Group – Malaysian marketing company
