= Public holidays in the Philippines =

- Observed by: Filipinos
- Type: Regular, special non-working, local
- Celebrations: Various

Public holidays in the Philippines are of two types: regular holidays and special non-working days.

== History ==
On July 25, 1987, President Corazon Aquino promulgated Executive Order No. 292 ("Administrative Code of 1987.") Chapter 7 of this code specifies a list of ten nationwide regular holidays and two nationwide special days and provided that the President may proclaim any local special day for a particular date, group or place. Seven regular holidays were specified with fixed dates, two with movable dates, and one assigned to the last Sunday in August. The code did not specify how the movable dates were to be determined.

In 2001, President Gloria Macapagal Arroyo decided to include Holiday Economics as part of the then-new government's list of principal economic policies, moving the celebration dates for holidays occurring on midweek days to weekend days. This was codified by Republic Act. No. 9492, approved on July 25, 2007, which replaced the list of holidays and special days. This act had been specified by the Administrative Code with a new list of eleven national holidays and three nationwide special days. The act also provided that Eidul Adha shall be celebrated as a holiday only in the Autonomous Region in Muslim Mindanao. The act specified two of the holidays and one special day with fixed dates, five of the holidays and two special days as occurring on a Monday nearest to or preceding specified dates, and two of the holidays as having movable dates. The act mandated that the President shall issue a proclamation for specifying the specific date movable holidays at least six months prior to the holiday concerned. The act also specified that holidays falling on a Wednesday will be observed on the Monday of that week, that holidays falling on a Sunday will be observed on the Monday that follows, and provided that regular holidays and special days may be modified by order or proclamation.

Presidential Proclamations issued subsequent to the promulgation of Republic Act No. 9492 established celebration dates for national holidays and special days, and established new holidays and special days, some nationwide and some local to specified localities.

== Holiday types ==
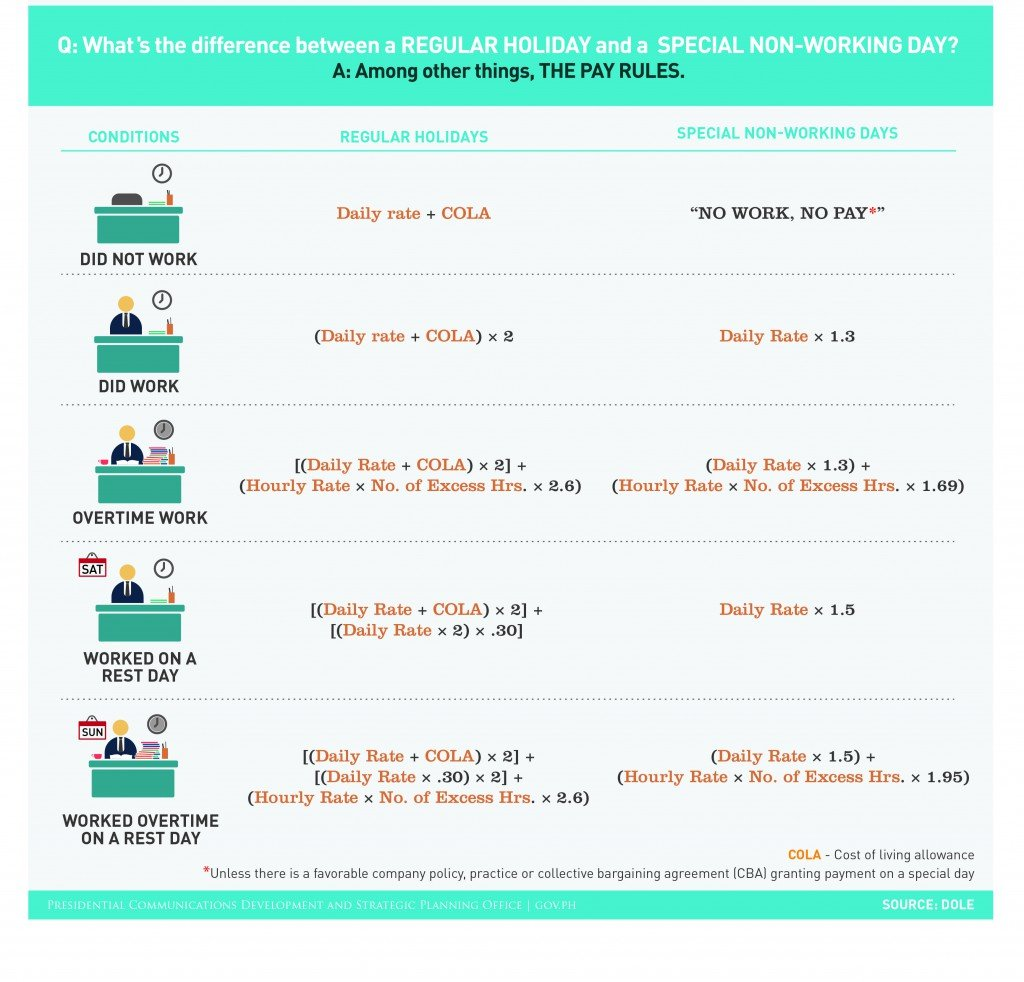
A graphic from the Office of the President of the Philippines showing the difference in pay between the two types of holidays.

The Labor Code of the Philippines specifies two types of holidays: the "regular holiday" and the "special non-working day". There is a difference in the pay that employers are required to pay between the two type of holidays. There is also a difference in what is closed and in how the days are declared.

Type	Pay if...	
Type	Did not work (including rest days)	Did work
Regular	100% of daily wage	200% of daily wage
Special (Non-working)	No pay	130% of daily wage

On top of these pay rules, an employee shall be given an additional 30% if the holiday falls on their rest day, and an additional 30% if they work overtime.

On a regular holiday, if the employee did not work, they are entitled 100% of their daily wage. However, a special non-working day usually follows a 'No Work, No Pay' principle. Therefore, the employee is not entitled to any compensation if they did not work that day. If the employee works on the special non-working day, they shall be entitled to an additional compensation of 30% of the regular daily wage.

== Former holidays ==
Independence Day was formerly celebrated on July 4, the date of the Philippine independence from the United States in 1946 deliberately selected as it is also American Independence Day. On May 12, 1962, President Diosdado Macapagal issued Presidential Proclamation No. 28, which declared Tuesday, June 12 a special public holiday throughout the Philippines, "... in commemoration of our people's declaration of their inherent and inalienable right to freedom and independence." On August 4, 1964, Republic Act No. 4166 renamed the July 4 holiday as "Philippine Republic Day", proclaimed June 12 as "Philippine Independence Day", and enjoined all citizens of the Philippines to observe the latter with befitting rites.

In 1955, President Ramón Magsaysay issued Presidential Proclamation No. 212, s. 1955, which established the observance of Philippine–American Day every November 15, the anniversary of the 1935 inauguration of the Commonwealth of the Philippines. Sometime under President Ferdinand Marcos, Philippine–American Day was renamed "Philippine–American Friendship Day" and moved to July 4, overshadowing the observance of the date as Republic Day. After the Third Republic and the abolition of the 1935 Constitution under Martial Law, it was impolitic to remind the nation of the old republic. This is why, when President Marcos issued Presidential Proclamation No. 2346 s. 1984, reference was made to Philippine–American Friendship Day, which was relegated to a working holiday without mention of Republic Day.

During the administration of President Corazon C. Aquino, the practice of celebrating July 4 as both Philippine–American Friendship Day and Republic Day as a non-working holiday was formally abolished. Section 26 of the Administrative Code of 1987 specified a list of regular holidays and nationwide special days that did not include July 4.

== Nationwide observance ==
Originally, there were only regular and special holidays. On February 26, 2021, former President Rodrigo Duterte announced the certain special holidays as special working holidays in 2021 under Proclamation No. 1107. This new measure is intended to boost productivity and economic recovery in the wake of the COVID-19 pandemic.

On October 13, 2023, President Bongbong Marcos announced that February 25 will no longer be a holiday in 2024 under Proclamation No. 368. Malacañang Palace stated that the event has "minimum socioeconomic impact" as it falls on a Sunday.

=== Non-working holidays ===
Regular non-working holidays
Date	English name	Filipino name	Transferability	Type	Description	Law
January 1	New Year's Day	Araw ng Bagong Taon	Fixed	Regular	Celebrates the first day of the year in Gregorian calendar.	Act No. 345
February 17 (2026)	Chinese New Year	Bagong Taon ng mga Tsino	Movable	Additional special	Also known as the Spring Festival or Lunar New Year.	None
April 2 (2026)	Maundy Thursday	Huwebes Santo	Movable	Regular	Part of the Triduum of Holy Week and includes the Mass of the Lord's Supper (the Last Supper).	Act No. 345
April 3 (2026)	Good Friday	Biyernes Santo	Movable	Regular	Part of the Triduum of Holy Week. Commemorates the suffering, crucifixion and death of Jesus Christ. Processions, passion plays, the recitation of the Pasyon, Siete Palabras, and various religious services are among the customs practiced on this day.	Act No. 345
April 4 (2026)	Black Saturday	Sábado de Gloria	Movable	Additional special	Part of the Easter Triduum and Holy Week. Commemorates Christ's Descent into Hell as his body lay in the Holy Sepulchre. Easter Vigil masses are held during this day at evening.	None
April 9	Day of Valor	Araw ng Kagitingan	Fixed	Regular	Commemorates the Fall of Bataan during the Japanese invasion of the Philippines, and by extension, the courage of Filipino and American soldiers throughout the Second World War. Defacto, this day also signals the traditional conclusion of the academic year for basic educational institutions in the country.	R.A. No. 3022
May 1	Labor Day	Araw ng Manggagawa / Araw ng Paggawa	Fixed	Regular	Anniversary of the May 1, 1903 rally by the Unión Obrera Democrática Filipina. Held in conjunction with the International Workers' Day.	Act No. 2711
June 12	Independence Day	Araw ng Kasarinlán / Araw ng Kalayaan	Fixed	Regular	Anniversary of the proclamation of the Philippine Declaration of Independence on June 12, 1898. From 1947 to 1964, Independence Day was celebrated on July 4 (see below). Traditionally, until 2019 and since 2025, it marked the start of the school year and formerly the university academic year (until the move to August in 2015–17). The holiday marked the end of the school year for students of basic academic institutions from 2020 to 2024 and today serves as the end of the university and college academic year.	R.A. No. 4166
August 21	Ninoy Aquino Day	Araw ng Kabayanihan ni Ninoy Aquino	Fixed	Special	Anniversary of Assassination of Benigno Aquino, Jr. in 1983. Public acts of remembrance are held to honor the memory of one of the nation's democracy fighters and de facto leader of the opposition for much of the 70s. Since 2016 it has been either the last holiday before most higher educational institutions (e.g. universities) begin their academic year or marks as the beginning of their academic semesters.	R.A. No. 9256 Moved to August 23 in 2024, by virtue of Proclamation No. 665, series of 2024.
August 25 (2025)	National Heroes Day	Araw ng mga Bayani	Movable	Regular	Anniversary of the 1896 Cry of Pugad Lawin by the Katipunan which began the Philippine Revolution and commemorates all the nation's heroes. Held on the last Monday of August. Marked as the final holiday before the beginning of the primary and secondary school academic year from 2021 to 2023.	Act No. 3827
November 1	All Saints' Day	Undás; Todos los Santos; Araw ng mga Santo	Fixed	Special	Filipinos observe this day by visiting family graves, repairing and cleaning tombs, and offering prayers, flowers, food, and candles. Many return to their native provinces for this, making it an occasion for reunions with extended family.	E.O. No. 292
November 2	All Souls Day	Araw ng mga Kaluluwa	Fixed	Additional special (special non-working until 2020, special working holiday in 2021 and 2022)	Traditions held on this day are similar to those of All Saints' Day.	None
November 30	Bonifacio Day	Araw ng Kapanganakan ni Andrés Bonifacio	Fixed	Regular	Birth anniversary of Andrés Bonifacio, de facto national hero. Bonifacio is remembered on his birthday, rather than the date of his death (May 10, 1897), because he was executed by the Filipino revolutionary government and not by colonial powers. Often confused with National Heroes' Day.	Act No. 2946
December 8	Feast of the Immaculate Conception of the Blessed Virgin Mary	Kapistahan ng Kalinís-linisang Paglilihî ng Mahál na Birheng María	Fixed	Special	Catholic solemnity marking the pure and sinless conception of the Blessed Virgin Mary, honored as Principal Patroness of the Philippines since 1942.	R.A. No. 10966
December 24	Christmas Eve	Bisperas ng Pasko	Fixed	Additional special (special non-working holiday until 2020, special working holiday in 2021 and 2022)	Marks the night preceding Christmas. Filipinos generally hold the Nochebuena meal at midnight.	None
December 25	Christmas Day	Araw ng Pasko	Fixed	Regular	Birth anniversary of Jesus Christ, main figure of Christianity.	Act No. 345
December 30	Rizal Day	Paggunita sa Kamatayan ni Dr. José Rizal	Fixed	Regular	Death anniversary of the Execution of José Rizal, considered by mainstream Filipinos as the de facto national hero.	Act No. 345; Republic Act No. 229
December 31	New Year's Eve	Bisperas ng Bagong Taon (Last Day of the Year/Eve of the new Year)	Fixed	Special (special working holiday in 2021 and 2022)	This holiday, which marks the conclusion of the civil year, is between two regular holidays, Rizal Day, and New Year's Day. This holiday is a special non-working day every December 31.	E.O. No. 292
Shawwal 1	Eid'l Fitr	Eidul Fitr / Araw ng Pagtatapos ng Ramadan	Fixed	Regular	The Islamic celebration marking the official end to the fasting month of Ramadan, the ninth month of the Islamic Calendar.	R.A. No. 9177
Dhu al-Hijjah 10	Eid'l Adha	Eidul Adha / Araw ng Kurban	Fixed	Regular	Feast ending the Hajj when Muslims sacrifice a goat, sheep, cow or a camel to be sent to the poor as a donation. The hajj is when Muslims go on required pilgrimage to Mecca.	R.A. No. 9849

=== Working holidays ===
Special working holidays are treated as ordinary working days: work and classes continue, and employees receive their regular daily wage with no premium pay.

Date	English name	Filipino name	Law or proclamation	Description
Nationwide special working holidays
Second Thursday of January	National Baptist Day	Pambansang Araw ng mga Baptist	Republic Act No. 11897	Honors the Baptist churches in the Philippines.
January 23	First Philippine Republic Day	Araw ng Unang Republika ng Pilipinas	Republic Act No. 11014	First observed in 2019. Commemorates the establishment of the First Philippine Republic on January 23, 1899, at the Barasoain Church in Malolos, Bulacan.
Last Monday of January	National Bible Day	Pambansang Araw ng Bibliya	Republic Act No. 11163	First observed in 2019. Recognizes the value of the Holy Bible as the core of the Christian faith professed by a majority of Filipinos.
February 4	Philippine–American War Memorial Day	Araw ng Paggunita sa Digmaang Pilipino–Amerikano	Republic Act No. 11304	First observed in 2020. Honors the Filipinos who fought and died in the war against the United States that began on February 4, 1899.
February 25	EDSA People Power Revolution Anniversary	Anibersaryo ng Rebolusyong EDSA	Proclamation No. 1006, s. 2025	Commemorates the 1986 People Power Revolution. Its status is set each year by the annual holiday proclamation; it is a special working day in 2026.
March 8	National Women's Day	Pambansang Araw ng Kababaihan	Republic Act No. 6949	Celebrates the social, economic, cultural and political achievements of women, in conjunction with International Women's Day.
April 27	Lapu-Lapu Day	Araw ni Lapu-Lapu	Republic Act No. 11040	First observed in 2019. Commemorates the victory of Lapu-Lapu over Spanish forces led by Ferdinand Magellan in the Battle of Mactan on April 27, 1521. It is a special non-working holiday in Lapu-Lapu City.
May 16	National Education Support Personnel Day	Pambansang Araw ng mga Kawaning Pang-edukasyon	Republic Act No. 12178	Honors non-teaching personnel in schools; its observance is led by the Department of Education and the Commission on Higher Education.
June 30	Philippine–Spanish Friendship Day	Araw ng Pagkakaibigang Pilipino-Espanyol	Republic Act No. 9187	Honors the Spanish soldiers of the Siege of Baler of 1898–99, the "last ones of the Philippines" (Los últimos de Filipinas), and the ties between Spain and the Philippines. It is a special non-working holiday in Aurora.
July 27	Iglesia ni Cristo Day	Araw ng Iglesia ni Cristo	Republic Act No. 9645	Commemorates the founding of the Iglesia ni Cristo in 1914. It was declared a special non-working day in 2014 for the church's centennial.
August 18	Jesse Robredo Day	Araw ni Jesse Robredo	Republic Act No. 10669	First observed in 2016 and observed in elementary and secondary schools. Honors the former mayor of Naga and Secretary of the Interior and Local Government, who died in an aviation accident on August 18, 2012.
August 19	Quezon Day	Araw ni Quezon	Republic Act No. 6741	Birth anniversary of President Manuel L. Quezon. It is a special non-working holiday in Quezon, Aurora and Quezon City.
August 25	National Tech-Voc Day	Pambansang Araw ng Edukasyong Teknolohikal-Bokasyonal	Republic Act No. 10970	First observed in 2018. Promotes technical and vocational education and training.
August 30	National Press Freedom Day	Pambansang Araw ng Kalayaan sa Pamamahayag	Republic Act No. 11699	First observed in 2022. Promotes the freedom of expression, speech and of the press. The date is the birth anniversary of Marcelo H. del Pilar, the father of Philippine journalism.
September 3	Yamashita Surrender Day	Araw ng Pagsuko ni Heneral Tomoyuki Yamashita	Republic Act No. 11216	First observed in 2019. Commemorates the surrender of General Tomoyuki Yamashita in Baguio on September 3, 1945, at the end of the Second World War.
September 8	Feast of the Nativity of the Blessed Virgin Mary	Pagdiriwang ng Kapanganakan ng Mahal na Birheng Maria	Republic Act No. 11370	Celebrates the birth of the Blessed Virgin Mary.
September 9	Osmeña Day	Araw ni Pangulong Osmeña	Republic Act No. 6953	Birth anniversary of President Sergio Osmeña. It is a special non-working holiday in Cebu.
November 7	Sheikh Karim'ul Makhdum Day	Araw ni Sheikh Karim'ul Makhdum	Republic Act No. 12228	Commemorates the building of the first Philippine mosque in 1380 and the introduction of Islam in the Philippines.
Muslim holidays observed in designated provinces and cities
Muharram 1	Islamic New Year (Amun Jadid)	Bagong Taong Islamiko	Presidential Decree No. 1083	Marks the beginning of the Islamic year.
Rabi' al-Awwal 12	Mawlid (Maulid un-Nabi)	Kaarawan ni Propeta Muhammad, Pistang Mawlid	Presidential Decree No. 1083	Celebrates the birth of the Prophet Muhammad.
Rajab 27	Isra and Mi'raj	Gabi ng Isra at Mi'raj	Presidential Decree No. 1083	Commemorates the night journey of Muhammad, marked on the 27th day of Rajab.
Under the Code of Muslim Personal Laws, Muslim holidays are officially observed in Basilan, Lanao del Norte, Lanao del Sur, Maguindanao del Norte, Maguindanao del Sur, Cotabato, Sultan Kudarat, Sulu, Tawi-Tawi, Zamboanga del Norte, Zamboanga del Sur, and Zamboanga Sibugay, and in the cities of Cotabato, Iligan, Isabela, Lamitan, Marawi, Pagadian and Zamboanga; Muslim government employees elsewhere are excused from work. Eid al-Fitr and Eid al-Adha are nationwide regular holidays.

=== Observances ===
The following are commemorated by law or proclamation but are not holidays.

Date	English name	Filipino name	Law or proclamation	Description
January 25	Day of National Remembrance	Araw ng Pambansang Pag-alala	Proclamation No. 164, s. 2017	First observed in 2018. Honors the 44 Special Action Force troopers killed in the Mamasapano clash on January 25, 2015.
January 29	National Police Anniversary Day	Araw ng Pagkakatatag ng Pambansang Pulisya		Marks the formation of the Philippine National Police in 1991 under Republic Act No. 6975, which merged the Philippine Constabulary and the Integrated National Police.
February 2	Constitution Day	Araw ng Saligang Batas	Proclamation No. 211	Commemorates the ratification of the 1987 Constitution.
March 22	Philippine Army Day	Araw ng Hukbong Katihan ng Pilipinas		Celebrates the founding of the Philippine Army at the Tejeros Convention in 1897. March 22 is also the birthday of Emilio Aguinaldo.
May 8	Radio Day	Araw ng Radyo sa Pilipinas		Marks the 1933 sign-on of DZRB-AM, the oldest radio station in the Philippines still in operation.
May 20	Philippine Navy Day	Araw ng Hukbong Dagat ng Pilipinas		Celebrates the 1898 founding of the Philippine Navy.
May 28	Flag Day	Araw ng Pambansang Watawat	Republic Act No. 8491	Commemorates the 1898 Battle of Alapan, when the national flag was first unfurled. National Flag Days run from May 28 to June 12.
June 19	José Rizal's birthday	Araw ng Kapanganakan ni José Rizal	Republic Act No. 11144 (Laguna)	Birth anniversary of José Rizal. It is a special non-working holiday in Laguna. June 20, 2011 was a special non-working holiday for Rizal's 150th birth anniversary.
July 1	Philippine Air Force Day	Araw ng Hukbong Himpapawid ng Pilipinas		Celebrates the 1947 creation of the Philippine Air Force as a separate service branch.
July 4	Republic Day; Philippine-American Friendship Day	Araw ng Republika; Araw ng Pagkakaibigang Pilipino-Amerikano	Republic Act No. 4166	Former national holiday marking the 1946 Treaty of Manila, under which the United States recognized Philippine independence, and the ties between the two countries.
July 25	National Campus Press Freedom Day	Pambansang Araw ng Malayang Pamamahayag sa Kampus	Republic Act No. 11440	First observed in 2020 in all educational institutions. Promotes freedom of expression and of the press in school campuses.
August 12	National Police Service Day	Araw ng Pambansang Serbisyong Pangpulisya		Honors the personnel of the Philippine National Police and its predecessors, on the anniversary of the 1901 formation of the Philippine Constabulary.
September 21	Anniversary of the declaration of martial law	Anibersaryo ng pagsisimula ng Batas Militar		Anniversary of Proclamation No. 1081 of 1972. Remembrance ceremonies honor the victims of martial law, and rallies commemorate the pro-democracy movement.
October 17	Philippine Coast Guard Day	Araw ng Tanod Baybayin ng Pilipinas		Marks the 1901 establishment of the Philippine Coast Guard.
October 23	Television Day	Araw ng Telebisyong Pilipino		Marks the first television broadcast in the Philippines, by DZAQ-TV in 1953.
October 24	United Nations Day	Araw ng mga Nagkakaisang Bansa	Proclamation No. 138, s. 1949	Marks the 1945 founding of the United Nations, of which the Philippines is a charter member. Schools often mark the day with programs in the national dress of member states.
October 31	Reformation Day	Araw ng Repormasyon		Anniversary of the start of the Protestant Reformation in 1517 and the eve of All Saints' Day (Halloween).
November 7	Philippine Marine Corps Birthday	Araw ng Hukbong Kawal Pandagat ng Pilipinas		Commemorates the formation of the Philippine Marine Corps in 1950 and the raising of the 1st regular Marine Corps battalion, the 1st Marine Rifle Battalion, in 1955.
November 17	National Students' Day	Pambansang Araw ng mga Mag-aaral	Republic Act No. 11369	First observed in 2019. Recognizes the contribution of student activism to Philippine democracy.
November 20	National Children's Day	Pambansang Araw ng mga Bata	Republic Act No. 10661	Marks the 1989 adoption of the Convention on the Rights of the Child, within National Children's Month.
December 10	Human Rights Day	Araw ng Karapatang Pantao	Proclamation No. 347, s. 1952	Marks the adoption of the Universal Declaration of Human Rights in 1948. It concludes National Human Rights Consciousness Week (December 4–10) under Republic Act No. 9201.
December 21	Armed Forces Day	Araw ng Hukbong Sandatahang Lakas ng Pilipinas		Anniversary of the 1935 formation of the Armed Forces of the Philippines.

==== Religious and cultural observances ====
The following are observed by religious communities or by custom and have no holiday status.

Date	English name	Filipino name	Description
Fifteenth day of the first lunar month	Lantern Festival	Piyesta ng mga Parol Tsino, Piyestang Siong Guan	Marks the end of the Chinese New Year festivities among Chinese Filipinos.
Full moon of May	Vesak Day	Araw ng Bisyak	Observed by Filipino Buddhists; recognized under Proclamation No. 24, s. 2001.
Fifteenth day of the eighth lunar month	Mid-Autumn Festival	Pista ng Gitnang Taglagas, Pistang Tiong Chiu	Harvest festival of the Chinese Filipino community.
Full moon of October	First Day of Kathina	Simula ng Pistang Kathina	Marks the end of Vassa for Filipino Buddhists.
Muharram 10	Ashura	Araw ng Ashura	Observed as a fast day by Sunni Muslims and as a day of mourning by the Shia community.
Sha'ban 15	Mid-Sha'ban	Gabi ng Niṣf Sha‘bān	Observed by some Filipino Muslims on the 15th of Sha'ban.
Ramadan 27	Night of Power	Gabi ng Laylat al-Qadr	Commemorates the revelation of the first verses of the Quran.
Dhu al-Hijjah 9	Day of Arafat	Araw ng Bundok Arafat	Commemorates the Propet Muhammad's Farewell Sermon in Mount Arafat.
September 1	Start of the Christmas season	Simula ng Kapaskuhan	By custom, the first of the "ber" months marks the start of the Philippine Christmas season.
Fourth Thursday of November	Thanksgiving Day	Araw ng Pasasalamat	A national holiday until 1971; now observed mainly by Filipino-Americans and American expatriates.
Day after Thanksgiving	Black Friday	Itim na Biyernes	A retail sales event within the Christmas shopping season.

== Local observance ==
Philippine cities, municipalities, or barangays, often observe one or more holidays. Being a predominantly Catholic country, these are usually the feasts of the locale's one or more patron saints.

Secular observances usually mark a government's founding day or the birth or death of a prominent native. These are often celebrated with parades, processions, entertainment, and feasting, as well as whatever local customs are traditional.

Local holidays for the most part are applicable only to the immediate area concerned, and barangay fiestas do not usually warrant a public holiday for the area unless otherwise ordered. Such holidays are usually declared as special non-working day and is proclaimed by the President.

Locally observed holidays
Date	English name	Filipino name	Description
January 9	Feast of the Image of the Black Nazarene	Fiesta ng Poong Itim na Nazareno, Traslasyon ng Nazareno	This special non-working holiday applies to the capital city of Manila only marking the 1787 transfer of the Black Nazarene from the Luneta area to Quiapo Church, its current home. One of the biggest festive holidays in Metro Manila, the procession and related events are attended by millions of devotees from all over the country.
January 11	Bataan Foundation Day	Araw ng Pagkakatatag ng Bataan	This special working holiday applies to Bataan only.
January 12	Valencia City Charter Day	Araw ng Pribilehiyo ng Lungsod ng Valencia	This regular holiday applies to Valencia, Bukidnon only.
January 16	Navotas Day	Araw ng Navotas	This regular holiday applies to Navotas only.
January 17	James Leonard Tagle Gordon Day	Araw ng Kapanangakan ni James Leonard Tagle Gordon	Celebrated only in Olongapo and the Subic Bay Freeport Zone, this holiday reflects on the achievements, contributions and heroism of the late politician and city mayor.
Third Sunday of January	Sinulog		This regular holiday applies to the province of Cebu and Tacloban only, honors the Santo Niño.
Monday after the third Sunday of January	Sinulog Rest Day		This regular holiday applies to the province of Cebu, Cebu City, Mandaue City, Lapu-Lapu City and other provinces and cities who joined in the year's Sinulog Festival in Cebu.
January 22	Vigan Cityhood Day	Araw ng Pagkalungsod ng Vigan	This regular holiday applies to the city of Vigan. It happens three days before the city's fiesta.
February 3	Blas Ople Birth Anniversary	Pagdiriwang ng Kapanangakan ni Blas Ople	This is only celebrated in the province of Bulacan. Celebrates the birth of Blas Ople, statesman and former senator.
February 3	Cabanatuan City Day	Araw ng Cabanatuan	This regular holiday applies to the city of Cabanatuan only.
February 3	Biñan Liberation Day	Araw ng Liberasyon ng Biñan	This special working holiday applies to the city of Biñan only.
February 9	Mandaluyong Liberation and Cityhood Day	Araw ng Liberasyon at Pagkalungsod ng Mandaluyong	This regular holiday applies to Mandaluyong only, honoring the 1945 liberation of Mandaluyong and its 1995 elevation to cityhood.
February 11	Evelio Javier Day	Araw ni Evelio Javier	This special non-working holiday applies to the provinces of Antique, Capiz, Aklan, and Iloilo only, in remembrance of the 1986 murder of the popular Governor of Antique whose death was one of the causes of the 1986 People Power Revolution.
February 13	Parañaque Day	Araw ng Parañaque	This regular holiday applies to Parañaque only.
February 14	Valenzuela City Day	Araw ng Lungsod ng Valenzuela	This special working holiday applies to Valenzuela only.
February 24	Cebu City Charter Day	Araw ng Pribilehiyo ng Lungsod ng Cebu	This regular holiday applies to Cebu City only.
February 24	Zamboanga Sibugay Day	Araw ng Zamboanga Sibugay	This special non-working holiday applies to Zamboanga Sibugay only.
February 26	Día de Zamboanga (Zamboanga Day)	Araw ng Zamboanga	This regular holiday applies only to Zamboanga City only as celebration of the anniversary of the inauguration of Zamboanga as a city, even its Charter was signed on October 12 which is also a holiday in celebration of the Feast of Nuestra Señora del Pilar, the city's patron saint.
February 21–27	Musikahan Festival		This regular holiday applies to Tagum only.
February 28	Tangub City Charter Day	Araw ng Pribilehiyo ng Lungsod ng Tangub	This special non-working holiday applies to Tangub only.
March 1	Muntinlupa City Charter Day	Araw ng Pribilehiyo ng Lungsod ng Muntinlupa	This special non-working holiday applies to Muntinlupa only.
March 2	La Union Day	Araw ng Pribilehiyo ng Lalawigan ng La Union	This special non-working holiday applies to La Union only.
March 2	Cavite Day	Araw ng Kabite	This special working holiday applies only in province of Cavite.
March 7	Tagum City Day	Araw ng Tagum	Commemorating the elevation of then Tagum municipality into the first component city of Davao del Norte. This regular holiday applies to Tagum only.
March 8	Davao de Oro Foundation Day	Araw ng Davao de Oro	This special working holiday applies to Davao de Oro province only, celebrating the foundation of the province in 1998.
March 16	Davao City Day	Araw ng Dabaw	Commemorating the signing of the Davao Charter, creating the city of Davao. This special non-working holiday applies to Davao City only.
March 18	Panay Liberation Day	Araw ng Liberasyon ng Panay	This regular holiday applies to all provinces and cities on the islands of Panay, Guimaras, and Romblon marking the 1945 liberation of these provinces by joint Filipino and American forces.
March 19	Sulyog Festival	Feast of St. Joseph	This day commemorates Saint Joseph, husband of the Blessed Virgin Mary, the patron saint of the town of Bongabong, Oriental Mindoro. This special non-working holiday applies to Bongabong, Oriental Mindoro only.
March 21	San Fabian Day	Araw ng San Fabian	This special working holiday applies to San Fabian, Pangasinan only.
March 21	Calapan City Foundation Day	Araw ng Pagkakatatag ng Syudad ng Calapan	This day commemorates the cityhood of Calapan, Oriental Mindoro in 1998. This special non-working holiday applies to city of Calapan only.
March 22	Malaybalay City Charter Day	Araw ng Pribilehiyo ng Lungsod ng Malaybalay	This special working holiday applies to Malaybalay only.
March 22	Emilio Aguinaldo Day	Kaarawan ni Emilio Aguinaldo	A holiday which was observed in 2019. Celebrates the birth anniversary of a Filipino revolutionary during the Philippine Revolution and the President of the Philippine Republic Emilio Aguinaldo.
March 25	Cry of Candon	Sigaw ng Candon / Ikkis ti Candon	This special working holiday applies to Candon only. March 25 commemorates the "Cry of Candon" in the city of Candon, Ilocos Sur, when local heroes led by Don Isabelo Abaya declared the Republica de Filipinas Katipunan de Candon. In honor of the men and women who sacrificed their lives for freedom, March 25 of every year is hereby declared a special nonworking holiday in the city of Candon.
March 27	San Juan Day	Araw ng San Juan	This special non-working holiday applies to San Juan only.
March 31	First Mass Day	Araw ng Unang Misa	This special working holiday only in province of Southern Leyte. In commemoration of the first mass held in Limawasa Island which was officiated on Easter Sunday of March 31, 1521 by Father Pedro de Valderrama under the fleet of Ferdinand Magellan.
April 3	Albay Day	Araw ng Albay	This special working holiday only in province of Albay. In commemoration of its founding anniversary.
April 5	Pangasinan Day	Araw ng Pangasinan	This special working holiday only in province of Pangasinan. In commemoration of its founding anniversary.
April 21	Calamba City Day	Araw ng Calamba	Commemorating the signing of the Calamba Charter, creating the city of Calamba. This special non-working holiday applies to Calamba only.
April 21	Orani Foundation Day	Araw ng Pagkakatatag ng Orani	This special non-working holiday applies to Orani only.
May 3 (Movable)	Sampaguita Festival	Pista ng Sampaguita	This regular holiday applies to San Pedro only.
May 3	Sta. Cruz Day	Araw ng Sta. Cruz	This special working holiday applies to Sta. Cruz only.
May 4	Ilagan Day	Aggaw na Ilagan	Celebrating the foundation of Ilagan (as municipality). This special non-working holiday applies to Ilagan only.
May 21	Malabon Day	Araw ng Malabon	This regular holiday applies to Malabon only.
May 24	Nueva Vizcaya Day	Ammungan Festival	The province's foundation day. This special non-working holiday applies to Nueva Vizcaya only.
May 27	San Jose Parish Fiesta	Fiesta ni Señor San José	Special non-working holiday in honor of Saint Joseph which only applies to Matalom, Leyte.
June 1	Biray Festival	Pistang Biray / Araw ng Imahen ng Birheng Maria	Honors the Blessed Virgin Mary as part of the Flores de Mayo in Belison, Antique. This special non-working holiday applies to Belison, Antique only.
June 6	Zamboanga del Norte Day	Araw ng Zamboanga del Norte	This special non-working holiday applies to Zamboanga del Norte only.
June 11	Rizal Province Day	Araw ng Rizal	This special non-working holiday applies to Rizal province only.
June 11	Sagay Day	Araw ng Sagay	This special non-working holiday applies to Sagay, Negros Occidental only.
June 15	Cagayán de Oro Charter Day	Araw ng Pribilehiyo ng Lungsod ng Cagayan de Oro	This special non-working holiday applies to Cagayan de Oro only.
June 15	Opol Day	Araw ng Opol	This special non-working holiday applies to Opol only.
June 16	Baybay City Charter Day	Araw ng Pribilehiyo ng Lungsod ng Baybay	This special working holiday applies to Baybay only.
June 16	Iligan City Charter Day	Araw ng Pribilehiyo ng Lungsod ng Iligan	This special working holiday applies to Iligan City only.
June 18	Naga City Charter Anniversary	Anibersaryo ng Pribilehiyo ng Lungsod ng Naga	This regular holiday applies to Naga, Camarines Sur only.
June 18	Benguet Foundation Day	Araw ng Pagkakatatag ng Benguet	This special non-working holiday applies to the province of Benguet only.
June 18	Bacolod City Charter Day	Araw ng Pribilehiyo ng Lungsod ng Bacolod	This special non-working holiday applies to Bacolod City only.
June 19	Surigao del Sur Day	Araw ng Surigao del Sur	This special non-working holiday applies to Surigao del Sur only.
June 19	Surigao del Norte Day	Araw ng Surigao del Norte	This special non-working holiday applies to Surigao del Norte only.
June 19	Feast of the Forest	Pista ng Kagubatan	This special working holiday applies to Palawan only celebrating the importance of forests in the province.
June 19	Laguna Day	Araw ng Laguna	This special non-working holiday applies to the province of Laguna only. This also commemorates Dr. José Rizal's birthday.
June 19	Calambanga Festival	Araw ng Calamba	This special non-working holiday applies to Calamba only. This also commemorates Dr. José Rizal's birthday and a review of the history of Calamba.
June 21	Naliyagan Festival	Pistang Naliyagan	Special non-working holiday, applies to Agusan del Sur only.
June 22	Pagadian City Day	Araw ng Pagadian	This special non-working holiday applies to Pagadian only.
June 23	Bacoor Cityhood Day	Araw ng Pagkalungsod ng Bacoor	This day commemorates the cityhood of Bacoor in the province of Cavite on June 23, 2012. This special non-working holiday applies to Bacoor only.
June 24	Manila Day	Araw ng Maynila	This special non-working holiday applies to the City of Manila only. It honors the 1571 founding of the city by Miguel López de Legaspi.
June 24	Wattah Wattah Festival	Pista ng San Juan	This special holiday applies to San Juan only. This day honor Saint John the Baptist, the patron saint of the city. Also known as the Feast of Saint John San Juan Festival.
June 26	Batanes Day	Araw ng Batanes	This special holiday applies to the province of Batanes only.
June 30	Tacloban Day and Tacloban City Charter Day	Araw ng Tacloban	This special non-working holiday applies to the city of Tacloban only.
June 30	Imus Cityhood Day	Araw ng Pagkalungsod ng Imus	This day commemorates the cityhood of Imus in the province of Cavite on June 30, 2012. This special non-working holiday applies to Imus only.
July 1	Tagbilaran City Charter Day	Araw ng Pribilehiyo ng Lungsod ng Tagbilaran	A day commemorating the creation of the city of Tagbilaran by virtue of Republic Act No. 4660 on July 1, 1966. This special non-working holiday applies only to Tagbilaran.
July 1	Davao Region Day	Araw ng Rehiyon ng Davao	Day commemorating the creation of the three Davao provinces from then a "single" Davao province, now Davao Region. This regular public holiday applies to the provinces of Davao del Norte, Davao del Sur and Davao Oriental only.
July 1	Maramag Day	Araw ng Maramag	Day commemorating the recognition of Maramag, Bukidnon as a municipality by virtue of Executive Order 272, which was signed by President Carlos P. Garcia on July 1, 1956. This special non-working holiday applies only to the municipality of Maramag.
July 1	Alubijid Day	Araw ng Alubijid	This special non-working holiday applies to Alubijid only.
July 1	Dipolog City Day	Araw ng Dipolog	This special non-working holiday applies to Dipolog only.
July 2	Pasig Foundation day	Araw ng Pasig	This special non-working holiday applies to Pasig only. Remembers the founding of the city in 1573.
July 4	Lanao del Norte Day	Araw ng Lanao del Norte	This regular holiday applies to Lanao del Norte only.
July 16	Ozamiz City Charter Day	Araw ng Pribilehiyo ng Lungsod ng Ozamiz	This special non-working holiday applies to Ozamiz only.
July 22	Bohol Day	Araw ng Bohol	A day commemorating the creation of the province of Bohol by virtue of Act No. 2711 on March 10, 1917, and the anniversary of the 1565 Blood Compact. This special non-working holiday applies only to the whole province of Bohol.
July 22	Claveria Day	Araw ng Claveria	This special non-working holiday applies to Claveria, Misamis Oriental in commemoration of its founding.
July 23	Apolinario Mabini Day	Kaarawan ni Apolinario Mabini	This special working holiday applies to Tanauan only, the city is the hometown of Apolinario Mabini, the prime minister of the First Philippine Republic.
July 23	Batangas City Day	Batangas City Foundation Day	This special non-working holiday applies to Batangas City in commemoration to its founding.
August 2	Butuan City Charter Day	Adlaw Hong Butuan	This holiday applies to Butuan only.
August 2	Kabankalan City Charter Day	Adlaw Kabankalan	This holiday applies to Kabankalan only.
August 4	Cabuyao Cityhood Day	Araw ng Pagkalungsod ng Cabuyao	This day commemorates the cityhood of Cabuyao in 2012. This special non-working holiday applies to city of Cabuyao only.
August 6	Cebu Provincial Charter Day	Araw ng Panlalawigang Pribilehiyo ng Cebu	This special nonworking holiday applies to the province of Cebu only.
August 9	Ablan Day	Kaarawan ni Ablan	Commemorates the birthday of Ilocos Norte's late governor and labor leader, Governor Roque B. Ablan, Sr.
August 15	Kadayawan Festival	Davao Harvest Festival	This special working holiday applies to Davao City only. (Proc. No. 829 declared that August 15 is a special non-working holiday)
August 15	Bulacan Foundation Day	Araw ng Bulacan	This special non-working holiday applies to the province of Bulacan only.
August 19	Manuel Luis Quezón Day	Kaarawan ni Manuel Luis Quezón	This special working holiday applies to the provinces of Quezon and Aurora, and to Quezon City only in honor of the anniversary of the birth of the Commonwealth President Manuel L. Quezon, born on this day in 1878.
August 20	Lucena City Charter Day	Araw ng Lungsod ng Lucena	This special non-working holiday applies to Lucena only by virtue of Republic Act No. 3271 – An Act Creating the city of Lucena, approved on June 17, 1961.
August 25	Iloilo City Charter Day	Araw ng Lungsod ng Iloilo	This regular holiday applies to Iloilo City only.
August 28	Higalaay Festival	Adlaw sa Pag-Higalaay sa Dakbayan sa Cagayan de Oro	Non-working holiday in Cagayan de Oro.
August 30	Pinaglabanan Day	Araw ng Pinaglabanan	This special non-working holiday applies to San Juan only, often in celebration of the 1896 Battle of Pinaglabanan, the first major battle of the Philippine Revolution and the first major defeat for revolutionary forces.
August 30	Gat. Marcelo H. Del Pilar Day	Kaarawan ni Gat. Marcelo H. Del Pilar	This special non-working holiday applies to province of Bulacan only.
August 31	Surigao City Charter Day	Araw ng Pribilehiyo ng Lungsod ng Surigao	This special non-working holiday applies to Surigao City only.
September 1	Baguio City Day	Araw ng Lungsod ng Baguio	Special non-working holiday only in Baguio marking its foundation in 1909.
September 1	Gregorio L. Aglipay Day	Paggunita sa Kamatayan ni Obispo Gregorio L. Aglipay	Special non-working holiday only in Batac to commemorate the death anniversary of Gregorio Aglipay, the first supreme bishop of the Philippine Independent Church.
September 1	Jasaan Day	Araw ng Jasaan	This special non-working holiday applies to Jasaan only.
September 2	Nueva Ecija Day	Araw ng Nueva Ecija	This special non-working holiday applies to the province of Nueva Ecija only.
September 2	Simeon Ola Day	Kaarawan ni Simeon Ola	This special non-working holiday applies to the province of Albay only. Commemorates the birth of Gen. Simeón Ola, the last Filipino army general who surrendered to the American forces during the Philippine-American War.
September 3	Iriga City Foundation Day	Araw ng Establisyento ng Syudad ng iriga	This is a Special Non-Working Day Iriga to honor the city's founding anniversary.
September 9	Osmeña Day	Araw ni Pangulong Osmeña	This is a Special Non-Working Day (Republic Act No. 6953) applicable in Cebu to honor the nation's fourth president on his birthday.
September 9	Mina Foundation Day	Araw ng Pagkatatag ng Bayan ng Mina	This special working holiday applies to Mina only.
September 9	San José del Monte City Day	Araw ng Lungsod ng San José del Monte	This regular holiday applies to San Jose del Monte only.
Second Friday — third Sunday of September	Peñafrancia Festival	Pista ng Peñafrancia	Applies only to Naga, Camarines Sur and honors the miraculous image of Our Lady of Peñafrancia, the patroness of the Bicol Region.
September 10	Feast of San Nicolás de Tolentino	Kapistahan ni San Nicolas de Tolentino	This regular holiday applies to Surigao City only.
September 11	Marcos Day	Araw ni Pangulong Marcos	This Special Non-Working Day (Proclamation No. 310) applies to the province of Ilocos Norte only and honors the birthday of the nation's tenth president.
September 13	Battle of Pulang Lupa Day	Araw ng Labanan sa Pulang Lupa	This special non-working holiday applies to the province of Marinduque only. Remembers the patriotic victory in the 1900 Battle of Pulang Lupa against American forces.
September 17	Siquijor Day	Araw ng Siquijor	This special non-working holiday applies to Siquijor only.
September 17	Zamboanga del Sur Day	Araw ng Zamboanga del Sur	This special non-working holiday applies to Zamboanga del Sur only.
September 18	Tacurong City Charter Day	Araw ng Pribilehiyo ng Lungsod ng Tacurong	This special working holiday applies to Tacurong only.
September 21	Cebu Press Freedom Day	Araw ng Malayang Pamamahayag sa Cebu	This special non-working holiday applies to the province of Cebu only.
September 24	Yulo Day	Araw ni José Yulo	REPUBLIC ACT NO. 7851 – Special Non-working Holiday in Calamba, Laguna, to commemorate the birth anniversary of the late speaker José Yulo Sr.
October 3	Imus Foundation Day	Araw ng Pagkatatag ng Bayan ng Imus	This day commemorating the foundation of Imus (as municipality) on October 3, 1795. This special non-working holiday applies to Imus only.
October 12	Fiesta Pilar	Araw ng Kapistahan ni Nuestra Señora del Pilar	This regular holiday applies to Zamboanga City only in celebration of its patron saint, Nuestra Señora del Pilar.
October 16	Oroquieta City Day	Araw ng Lungsod ng Oroquieta	This special non-working holiday applies to Oroquieta only.
October 19	Bacolod City Charter Day	Araw ng Pribilehiyo ng Lungsod ng Bacolod	This special non-working holiday only applies to Bacolod.
October 20	Leyte Landing Day	Araw ng Leyte Landing	This regular holiday applies to Tacloban only. Commemorates the landing of American and Filipinos forces on Palo Beach during the Battle of Leyte in 1944, signalling the beginning liberation of the country in the Second World War.
October 26	Foundation Day of Catanduanes	Araw ng Pagkakatatag ng Catanduanes	This special non-working holiday applies to Catanduanes only.
October 28	Foundation Day of Davao Occidental	Araw ng Pagkakatatag ng Davao Occidental	This special non-working holiday applies to Davao Occidental only.
November 4	President Carlos P. Garcia Day	Araw ni Pangulong Garcia	Commemorates the birth of Carlos P. Garcia, the eighth President of the Philippines, native of Bohol. This special non-working holiday applies only to the Province of Bohol.
November 5	Al Cinco de Noviembre (Negros Day)	Araw ng Negros	Also called Al Cinco de Noviembre, this special non-working holiday applies to the province of Negros Occidental only. Honors the 1898 Negros Revolution and those who took part.
November 8	Godofredo "Goding" P. Ramos Day	Araw ni Goding Ramos	This special non-working holiday applies to the province of Aklan only, in commemoration of the birth anniversary of Godofredo P. Ramos, the “Father of Aklan.”
November 15	Oriental Mindoro Day	Araw ng Silangang Mindoro	This special non-working holiday applies to the province of Oriental Mindoro only, the province became an independent and separated from Occidental Mindoro via Republic Act No. 505 on this day in 1950.
November 16	Quirino Day	Araw ni Quirino	To commemorate the birth anniversary of late President Elpidio Quirino as declared under Presidential Proclamation No. 1927 dated November 15, 1979 issued by the late President Ferdinand E. Marcos. This special non-working holiday applies to the province of Ilocos Sur only, the very province on which he was born in its capital of Vigan.
December 1	Kabakahan Festival	Pista ng Kabakahan	This special non-working holiday applies to Padre Garcia, Batangas only.
December 2	Pasay City Day	Araw ng Pasay	This special non-working holiday applies to Pasay only, the city was founded on this day in 1863.
December 8	Taguig Holiday	Araw ng Taguig	As per Proclamation No. 81 signed December 1, 2010, Taguig Holiday is celebrated henceforth every December 8.
December 11	Pampanga Day	Araw ng Pampanga	Under the virtue of Proclamation No. 2226 of late President Ferdinand Marcos. This special non-working holiday applies to the province of Pampanga only, celebrating its 1571 founding as one of the nation's oldest provinces.
December 13	General Trias Foundation Day and Valenciana Festival	Araw ng Pagkakatatag ng General Trias at Pistang Valenciana	This special working holiday applies of General Trias only.
December 18	López Jaena Day	Araw ni Lopez Jaena	This regular holiday in Iloilo province and Iloilo City only. Honors Graciano López Jaena and his contributions to the Propaganda Movement of the 1880s.
December 20	Feast Day of Santa Lucia	Kapistahan ni Santa Lucia	This day commemorates Saint Lucy, the patron saint of the town of Santa Lucia, Ilocos Sur. This special non-working holiday applies to Santa Lucia, Ilocos Sur only.
December 29	San Pedro Cityhood Day	Araw ng Pagkalungsod ng San Pedro	This day commemorates the cityhood of San Pedro, Laguna in 2013. This special non-working holiday applies to city of San Pedro only.

== Proposal ==
The Senate considered to consolidate holidays honoring former presidents into a single holiday, similar to the U.S. Presidents' Day, to enhance the competitiveness of Filipino companies. Senate President Francis Escudero emphasized the need to reduce the number of holidays in the levels of cities, municipalities, and provinces, including those of national level (besides religious), noting that the current total of more than one month hampered productivity. However, labor groups opposed reducing holidays, arguing that it would deprive employees of valuable benefits and that there is no direct link between holidays and productivity. They contended that the move would primarily benefit employers by lowering costs through the reduction of holiday pay.
