= Ninoy Aquino Day =

National holiday in the Philippines

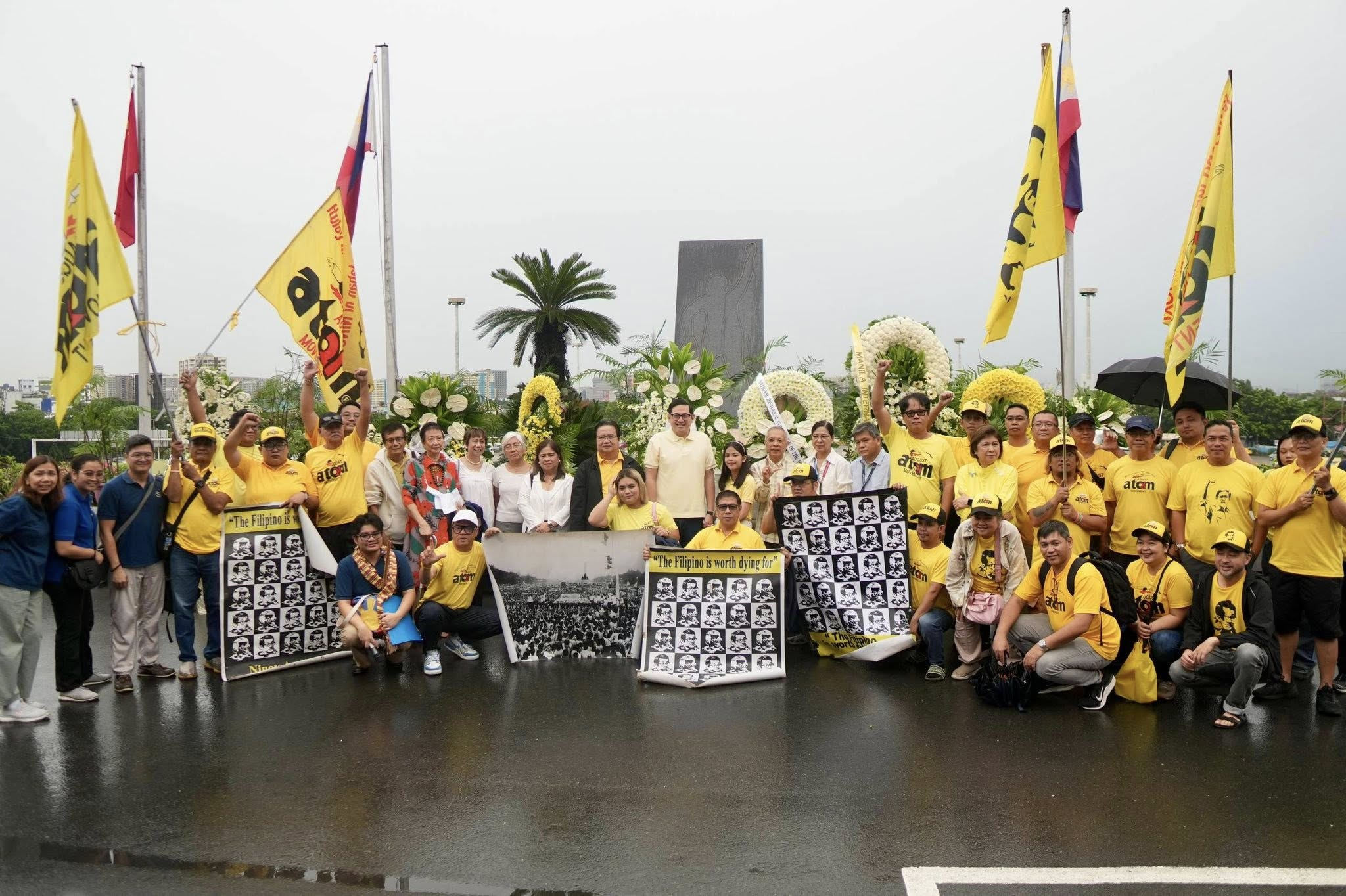
- Wreath-laying at NAIA Terminal 1 to mark Ninoy Aquino Day 2025, led by Senator Bam Aquino with members of the August Twenty One Movement.
- Official name: Commemoration of the Assassination of Ninoy Aquino
- Observed by: Philippines
- Type: National
- Date: August 21
- Next time: August 21, 2027
- Frequency: Annual
- First time: 2004

Ninoy Aquino Day is a national non-working holiday in the Philippines observed annually on August 21 commemorating the assassination of former Senator Benigno "Ninoy" Aquino, Jr., the husband of Corazon Aquino, who later became the eleventh Philippine President. His assassination led to the downfall of the tenth president, dictator, and kleptocrat Ferdinand Marcos, which ultimately resulted in the People Power Revolution on February 25, 1986. Since 2004, a commemoration ceremony is traditionally held that was attended by presidents Gloria Macapagal Arroyo, Fidel V. Ramos and Benigno Aquino III.

Unlike other dates reserved for national heroes of the Philippines (like Bonifacio Day, Rizal Day, Day of Valor (Araw ng Kagitingan), and National Heroes Day), the date is not a "regular holiday" (double pay for working nationals) but only a "special non-working holiday" (premium of thirty-percent for working nationals), according to the Labor Code of the Philippines.

== Background ==
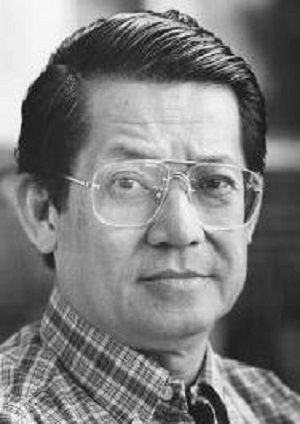
A photo of Ninoy Aquino

Aquino was a well-known opposition figure and critic of the then-President Ferdinand Marcos. Due to his beliefs, he was later imprisoned for about eight years after martial law was declared in the Philippines. Even in his imprisonment, he sought a parliamentary seat for Metro Manila in the Interim Batasang Pambansa under the banner of the Lakas ng Bayan (LABAN) in 1978. He eventually led in the opinion polls and was initially leading the electoral count but eventually lost to the Kilusang Bagong Lipunan (KBL) slate led by First Lady Imelda Marcos. Aquino remained in prison but continued to fight for democracy in the country and against the oppression of the Filipino people. After suffering from a heart attack in March 1980, he and his family moved to the United States for medical treatment, eventually leading to his self-imposed exile for about three years. There, he continued his advocacy by giving speeches to the Filipino-American communities.

Later, he planned to return to the Philippines to challenge Marcos for the parliamentary elections in 1984. Though some did not feel this was a good idea, he still did so in 1983. Upon returning to the country at Manila International Airport (now renamed Ninoy Aquino International Airport in his honor), he was shot and killed on August 21, 1983, as he was escorted off an airplane by security personnel. This led to several protests at his funeral that sparked snap presidential elections in 1986, which led to the People Power Revolution, catapulting his wife, Corazon Aquino, to the presidency.

== History ==
Ninoy Aquino Day Law

Congress of the Philippines
- Long title: An Act Declaring August 21 of Every Year as Ninoy Aquino Day, A Special Nonworking Holiday, And For Other Purposes
- Citation: Republic Act No. 9256
- Territorial extent: Philippines
- Signed by: Gloria Macapagal Arroyo
- Signed: February 25, 2004

Keywords
- Ninoy Aquino, Martial law under Ferdinand Marcos, Assassination of Ninoy Aquino
- Status: In force

The holiday was created by Republic Act No. 9256, which was signed into law by President Gloria Macapagal Arroyo on February 25, 2004, twenty-one years after his death and eighteen years after the People Power Revolution, and was sponsored by Senate President Franklin Drilon and House Speaker Jose de Venecia Jr. It requires an EDSA People Power Commission (EPPC) to hold activities in observance the day and shall be funded from the Budget of the Office of the President and from private donations. This holiday was created for the late Senator Ninoy Aquino while simultaneously declaring via proclamation Jose W. Diokno Day on February 27 for the other martial law hero. Both Aquino and Diokno were the first senators imprisoned under martial law.

A commemoration ceremony was held at the People Power Monument in Quezon City, which was attended by Presidents Arroyo and Corazon Aquino (Ninoy's widow) with her family, and government officials such as members of the cabinet, top police, and military brass.

The holiday was included in President Arroyo's program of "holiday economics", adjusting the observance of the holiday to the nearest Monday in order to boost the tourism industry with long weekends. In 2010, it was moved back to its original date by Aquino's son, President Benigno Aquino III.

In 2022, during the first Ninoy Aquino Day under President Bongbong Marcos, the son of the late President Ferdinand Marcos, most official government agencies' social media accounts were noticeably silent. There was also no commemorative statement from the Office of the President for that year, but began releasing such from 2023 onwards.

In 2024, the observance was moved to Friday, August 23, through Proclamation No. 665, signed by President Bongbong Marcos on August 15. The adjustment was made to create a longer weekend that would encourage domestic tourism, as Monday, August 26, is already declared as National Heroes Day. However, Representative Edcel Lagman (Albay–1st) and Bagong Alyansang Makabayan's Renato Reyes separately criticized the move, with Lagman calling it illegal, citing Republic Act No. 9492, which requires that holidays on a Wednesday be moved to the preceding Monday with six-month prior notice.

== Ceremonies ==
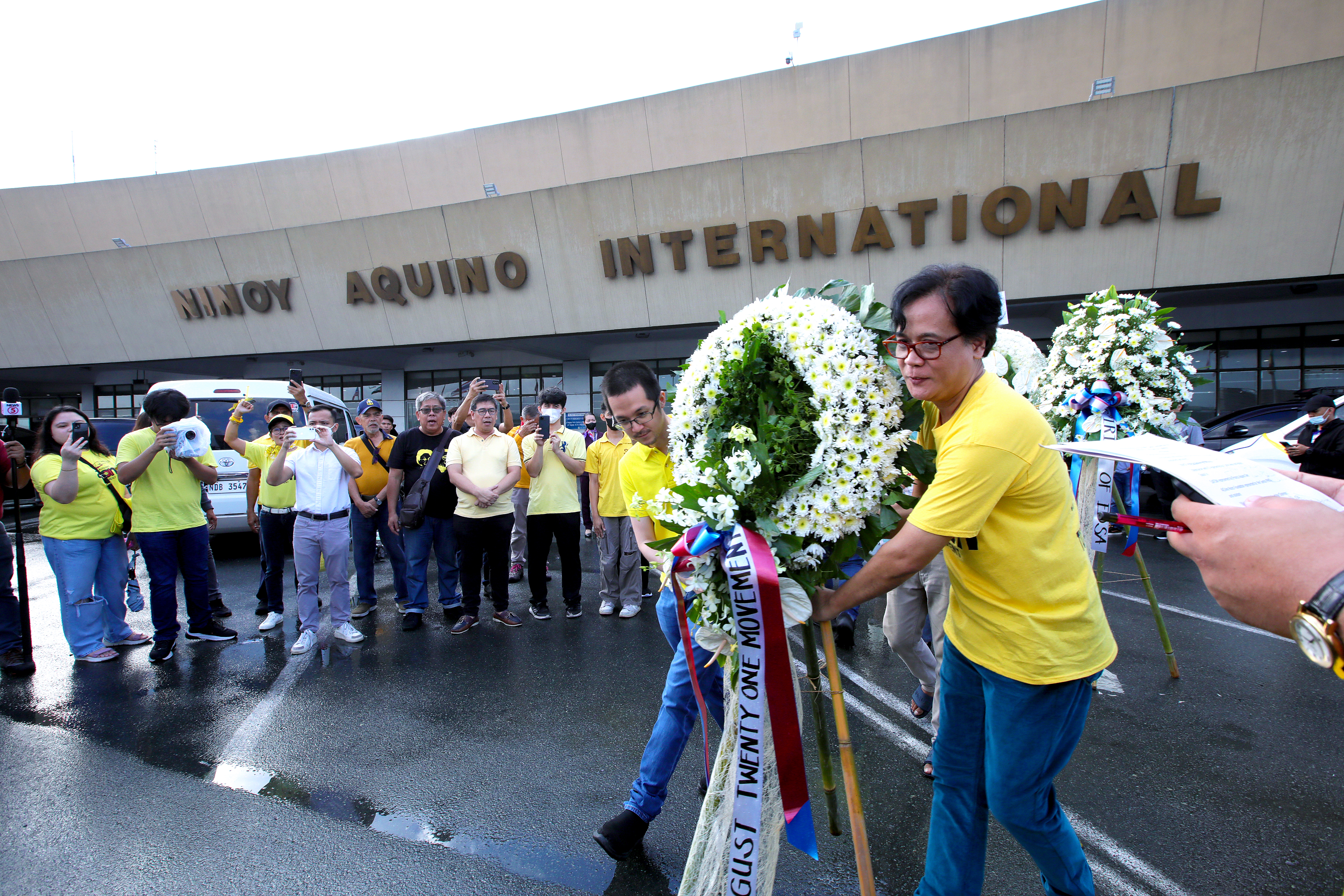
Kiko Aquino Dee (left), a grandson of Ninoy Aquino, offers flowers at Ninoy Aquino International Airport on Ninoy Aquino Day 2023.

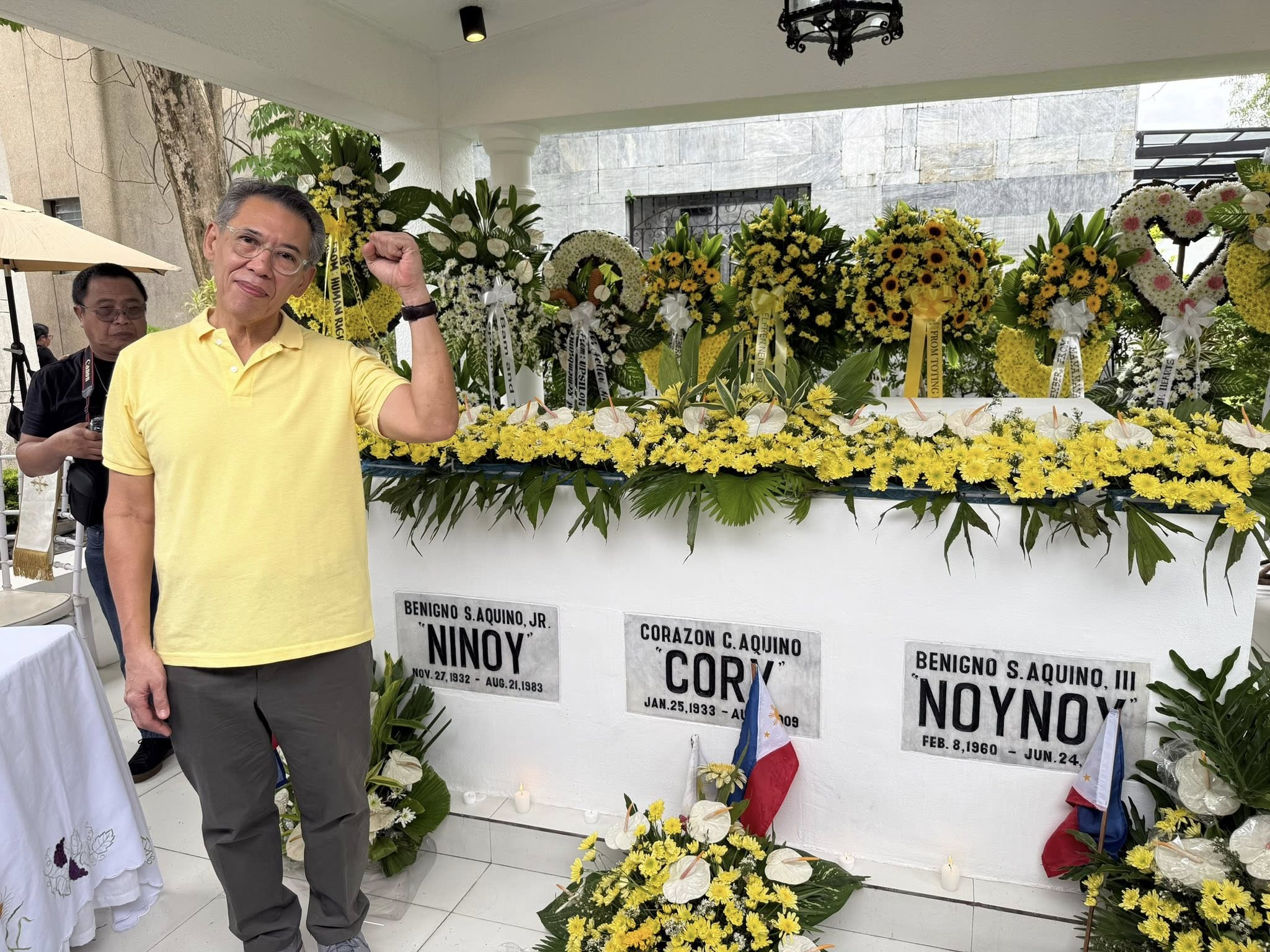
Akbayan Representative Chel Diokno at the Aquino mausoleum, Manila Memorial Park – Sucat on Ninoy Aquino Day 2025

Commemorative ceremonies for Ninoy Aquino Day are typically held at monuments and memorials dedicated to Ninoy Aquino across the Philippines, with the EDSA Commission legally tasked with planning and implementing appropriate ceremonies. A notable gathering by Aquino's supporters and family also takes place at the Aquino mausoleum at the Manila Memorial Park – Sucat in Parañaque, Metro Manila, where he is interred alongside his wife Corazon Aquino and their son Benigno Aquino III. A Catholic Mass is also held at the mausoleum. The August Twenty One Movement (ATOM), which was formed to protest to Aquino's assassination, also holds special events during this day.

== See also ==
- Public holidays in the Philippines
