= Paid time off in the United States =

Employer-paid vacation or sick leave

Paid time off (PTO) is a chiefly American term for any employee benefit that provides an amount of hours off from typical work, while still providing income. In the United States, this policy differs significantly from the annual and sick leave of most countries, as there are no federal legal requirements for a minimum number of paid days off, regardless of illness or years worked. Instead, U.S. companies determine the amount of paid time off that will be allotted to employees, often with a "bank" of hours separated into categories of vacation, sick or personal time off.

Availability of paid time off varies by type and profession. While 78% of private-sector workers have access to any amount of paid sick leave through PTO programs, 28 million U.S. workers lack access, especially part-time workers and those employed in the food service industry. Some PTO plans may also accommodate unexpected or unforeseeable circumstances such as jury duty, military service, and bereavement leave. PTO bank plans typically do not include short-term or long-term disability leave, workers compensation, family and medical leave, sabbatical, or community service leave.

Consolidated PTO plans include all categories of leave, such as vacations to sick days, and are becoming more prevalent in the field of human resource management. As of 2012, it is unclear whether these plans result in more or less total hours off for subscribing workers. Upon employment, the company determines how many PTO hours will be allotted per year and a "rollover" policy. Some companies let PTO hours accumulate for only a year, and unused hours disappear at year-end.

It is unclear as to when PTO bank-type plans were first implemented in the workforce. In a 2010 study conducted by WorldatWork, 44% of 387 companies surveyed said they started using PTO bank-type plans prior to year 2000.

Supporters of PTO argue that such breaks have various benefits such as increasing worker productivity and reducing stress, along with allowing for longer parental care.

== Workforce trends ==
A longitudinal study conducted by World at Work of over 1,000 organizations of different sizes concluded that over recent years, PTO plans have become more actively utilized by the general workforce. In 2002, about 71% of organizations were using traditional distinguished paid time off system, and about 28% were utilizing the PTO bank-type system. As of 2010, the use of the traditional paid time off system decreased to 54%, while the use of the PTO bank system increased to around 40% of all organizations.

Recent information may indicate that PTO bank-type plans are difficult to implement in very large organizations. In 2010, only 32% of organizations with 20,000+ employees had a PTO bank-type system. However, 51% of organizations with 10,000-19,999 employees had PTO bank-type plans. In organizations with less than 100 employees, 48% had PTO bank-type plans.

In the 2010 study performed by World at Work, industrial differences were also found. 97% of organizations in the Education industry use traditional paid time off plans with only 3% utilizing a PTO bank-type system. On the other hand, 80% of organizations in the Health-care and Social Assistance industry utilize PTO bank-type systems.

As of 2012, nearly one in five employees in the United States receive leave in the form of a PTO bank plan, but the contours of such policies are often little understood—especially outside of the human resources community.

Among employees with paid leave, lower-wage employees are less likely to have access to a PTO bank than a traditional paid vacation system. 51% of employees in the lowest average wage quartile have access to any vacation time, and only 9 percent of the lowest wage employees have access to a PTO bank. 89% of employees in the highest wage quartile have access to vacation time and 28% have access to a PTO bank.

There is also a difference in PTO among employment status. 9% of Part-time employees have access to a PTO bank, whereas about 23% of full-time employees do.

14% of unionized organizations have access to PTO bank-type plans.

=== Length of service ===
Paid time off usually increases with years of service to an organization. This provides a greater benefit for employees who have been with the organization longer.

== Differences between jurisdictions ==
Roughly twelve states and Washington DC currently have legislation in place for regulating paid sick leave. Nevada and Maine, which both passed laws in 2019, have the only policies saying that state-mandated PTO can be used for things other than illness.

=== Federal ===
Because there are no federal requirements in the United States, the states must each determine respective regulations for paid time off in the state labor law. Because of this, employers not only need to be aware, but also need to establish and follow a formal written policy for paid time off. Failing to formally establish paid time off policies may result in violating the state's code and the policy not being legally enforceable.

=== California ===
Vacation is legally vested per formal language in the California Labor Code. Vacation cannot be forfeited once earned, and unused balances must be paid out upon termination.

=== Pennsylvania ===
There is no Pennsylvania labor law which requires an employer to pay an employee not to work. Benefits like sick leave, vacation pay, and severance pay are payments to an employee not to be at work. Therefore, an employer only has to pay these benefits if the employer has a policy to pay such benefits or a contract with you to pay these benefits. An employer must follow its own rules for these kinds of payments.

Most states, in fact, do not require unused vacation balances to be paid out upon termination, and very few states have formal rules protecting employees from changes in the vacation policy; however, all states must comply with federal labor laws such as the Family Medical Leave Act.

=== New York City ===
In January 2014, 16 days after taking office, Mayor Bill de Blasio put forward paid sick leave legislation to expand this right to more New Yorkers, including 200,000 of whom did not have any paid sick days. The law took effect on April 1 and applies to all workers at businesses with five or more employees, encompassing those excluded under the previous legislation that applied to businesses with 15 or more workers. This law was expanded under the Mamdani administration in February 2026, allowing employees to use their leave for other protected reasons, such as to care for a child or to stay at home during a public emergency, such as a power outage.

== See also ==
- Right to rest and leisure
- Holiday pay
