= Labor Code of the Philippines =

Legal code for Filipino labor laws

The Labor Code of the Philippines is the legal code governing employment practices and labor relations in the Philippines. It was enacted through Presidential Decree No. 442 on Labor day, May 1, 1974, by President Ferdinand Marcos in the exercise of his then extant legislative powers.

The Labor Code sets the rules for hiring and firing of private employees; the conditions of work including maximum work hours and overtime; employee benefits such as holiday pay, thirteenth-month pay and retirement pay; and the guidelines in the organization and membership in labor unions as well as in collective bargaining. The prevailing labor code allows the typical working hour to be 8 hours a day, i.e. 40 hours a week with the provision that at least a day should be allowed to the workers as weekly off. The minimum age allowed for employment is considered 15 years in the Philippines, unless the individuals are working under direct supervision of their parents.

The Labor Code contains several provisions which are beneficial to labor. It prohibits termination of employment of Private employees except for just or authorized causes as prescribed in Article 282 to 284 of the Code. The right to self-organization of a union is expressly recognized, as is the right of a union to insist on a closed shop.

Strikes are also authorized for as long as they comply with the strict requirements under the Code, and workers who organize or participate in illegal strikes may be subject to dismissal. Moreover, Philippine jurisprudence has long applied a rule that any doubts in the interpretation of law, especially the Labor Code, will be resolved in favor of labor and against management.

The Labor Code has been amended numerous times since it was first enacted. The most significant amendment was brought about by the passage of Republic Act (R.A.) No. 6725, which was enacted on May 12, 1989, under the administration of President Corazon Aquino. R.A. 6725 is also known as the Herrera Law and was authored by Senator Ernesto Herrera. Senator Leticia Ramos Shahani also introduced amendments to strengthen prohibitions against discrimination against women.

Subsequent amendments were also introduced under the administration of President Fidel V. Ramos.

== Specific features ==
=== Wages and monetary benefits ===
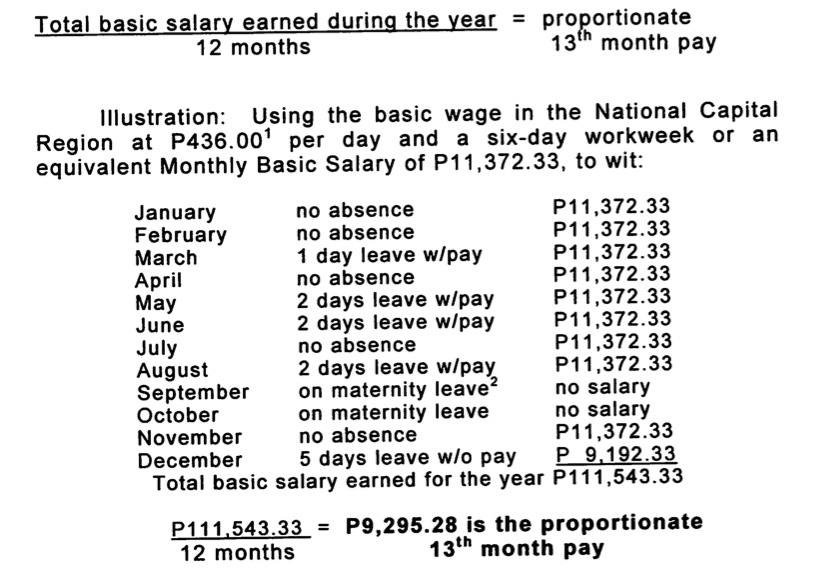
Taken from Labor Advisory No. 12 Series of 2013: Payment of Thirteenth Month Pay

1. Minimum wage
  - Remunerations or earnings paid by an employer to an employee for service rendered are called wages. Article 99 of the Labor Code of the Philippines stipulates that an employer may go over but never below minimum wage. Paying below the minimum wage is illegal. The Regional Tripartite Wages and Productivity Boards is the body that sets the amount for the minimum wage. In the Philippines, the minimum wage of a worker depends on where he works.
2. Thirteenth month pay
  - According to Presidential Decree No. 851, an employer is mandated by law to give his employees thirteenth month pay. The thirteenth month pay required by law should not be less than one twelfth of the total basic salary earned by an employee within a calendar year. The thirteenth month pay is exempted from being taxed by the government. The photo below is from the Department of Labor and Employment, which shows the computation of a hypothetical thirteenth month pay.
3. Retirement pay

=== Hours of work ===
1. Normal hours of work
  - Article 83 and 84 of the Philippine Labor Code,
2. Overtime work
  - Article 87 of the Philippine Labor Code states that any work that exceeds eight hours is considered overtime work. This is legal provided that the employee is paid for the overtime work. The computation for the wage is his regular wage plus at least twenty-five percent (25%) of his hourly wage. Work performed beyond eight hours on a holiday or rest day shall be paid an additional compensation equivalent to the rate of the first eight hours on a holiday or rest day plus at least thirty percent (30%) thereof.
3. Night shift differential
  - Article 86 of the Philippine Labor Code explains that the night shift is between ten o'clock in the evening and six o'clock in the morning. A night shift differential is payment of not less than ten percent (10%) of the regular hourly wage of an employee for each hour of work performed during this time period.

=== Rest days ===
1. Weekly rest day
  - An employer is required to provide each of his employees a rest period of not less than twenty-four consecutive hours after every six consecutive normal work days, as stated in Article 91 of the Philippine Labor Code. The employer shall determine and schedule the weekly rest day of his employees. He must respect the preference of employees as to their weekly rest day when such preference is based on religious grounds.
  - If an employer requires his employee to work on his scheduled rest day, he shall be paid an additional compensation of at least thirty percent (30%) of his regular wage.
  - If the employee has no regular work days or rest days, and he is required by his employer to work on a Sunday and on a holiday, he shall be paid an additional compensation of at least thirty percent (30%) of his regular wage.

=== Holiday pay ===
1. Special non-working holiday pay
  - If an employee works on August 21 (Ninoy Aquino Day), November 1 (All Saints' Day), and/or December 31 (Last Day of the year), his wage will be:
    - for first eight hours of work – plus thirty percent (30%) of the daily rate
    - for excess of eight hours of work – plus thirty percent (30%) of hourly rate on said day
  - If an employee works on August 21 (Ninoy Aquino Day), November 1 (All Saints' Day), and/or December 31 (Last Day of the Year) and it falls under his rest day, his wage will be
    - for the first eight hours of work – plus fifty percent (50%) of the daily rate
    - excess of eight hours of work – plus thirty percent (30%) of hourly rate on said day
2. Regular holiday pay
  - Article 93 and 94 of the Philippine Labor Code states that a worker shall be paid his regular daily wage during regular holidays whether or not the employee goes to work. The employer can require an employee to work on any holiday, but the employee must be paid an amount double his regular wage.
  - If the holiday falls under the employee's rest day, and he decides to work, his wage for the first eight hours of his work will be doubled. If he works for more than eight hours, then thirty percent (30%) of his hourly rate will be added to his wage for that day.
  - The regular holidays according to Executive Order No. 292 as amended by Republic Act No. 9849 are as follows:
    - New Year's Day – January 1
    - Maundy Thursday – Movable Date
    - Good Friday – Movable Date
    - Araw ng Kagitingan – April 9
    - Labor Day – 1 May
    - Independence Day – June 12
    - Eid'l Fitr – Movable Date
    - Eid'l Adha – Movable Date
    - National Heroes Day – Last Monday of August
    - Bonifacio Day – November 30
    - Christmas Day – December 25
    - Rizal Day – December 30

=== Leave ===
1. Service incentive leave
  - Article 95 of the Philippine Labor Code states that if an employee has given at least one year of service, he shall be entitled to a yearly service incentive leave of five days with pay.
2. Paternity leave
  - The paternity leave is not found in the Labor Code. The basis for the paternity leave is Republic Act No. 8187, otherwise known as the "Paternity Leave Act of 1996". Republic Act No. 8187 states that a married male employee is allowed to take 7 days off work with full pay for the first four deliveries.
3. Maternity leave
  - Republic Act No. 7322 states that a pregnant employee who has paid at least three monthly maternity contributions to the Social Security System in the twelve-month period preceding the semester of her childbirth, abortion or miscarriage and who is currently employed shall be paid a daily maternity benefit equivalent to one hundred percent (100%) of her present basic salary, allowances and other benefits or the cash equivalent of such benefits for sixty for normal delivery a seventy-eight for caesarian delivery.
  - The maternity leave can be extended without pay if any illness medically certified are to come as a result of the pregnancy, delivery, abortion, or miscarriage which leaves the woman unfit to work.
  - As with the paternity leave, the maternity leave is only valid for the first four deliveries.

=== Employment of women ===
1. Facilities for women
  - .
2. Discrimination
  - Article 134 of the Labor Code of the Philippines states that a woman cannot be paid a lesser compensation than a man for work of equal value.
  - Favoring a male employee over a female employee with regard to promotion, training opportunities, study, scholarship grants based on only their sexes is also illegal.
3. Prohibited acts
  - Based on Article 137 the employer is not allowed to:
    - Deprive any woman employee of any of the benefits mentioned above and in Articles 130–136 of the Labor Code or to terminate any woman employee for the purpose of stopping her from enjoying said benefits.
    - Terminate a woman because of her pregnancy while on leave or in confinement due to it.
    - Discharge or refuse the admission of such woman from returning to her work for fear that she may again be pregnant.

=== Employment and termination ===
1. Security of tenure
  - Article 279 of the Labor code In cases of regular employment, the employer shall not terminate the services of an employee except for a just cause or when authorized by this Title. An employee who is unjustly dismissed from work shall be entitled to reinstatement without loss of seniority rights and other privileges and to his full back wages, inclusive of allowances, and to his other benefits or their monetary equivalent computed from the time his compensation was withheld from him up to the time of his actual reinstatement. (As amended by Section 34, Republic Act No. 6715, March 21, 1989)
  - An employee will be considered a regular employee if he has been able to performs tasks that are necessary in the business or trade of the employer, except when the employee was hired for a specific project and its completion also signifies the employee's termination and if the nature of work or services is seasonal and the employment is for the duration of the season. The employment is said to be casual if his nature of work has not been covered by the aforementioned sentences. After a year of rendering service, whether continuous or not, an employee shall be deemed regular, as stated by Article 280 of the Philippine Labor Code.
2. Probationary employment
  - Article 281 of the Labor Code states that probationary employment should not go over six months unless it is under an apprenticeship agreement stipulating a longer period. An employee who continues to work after the probationary period will be considered a regular employee. A probationary employee may be discharged for a just cause or when he fails to qualify as a regular employee.

=== Benefits ===
1. Social security benefits
  - According to Republic Act No. 1161, as amended by Republic Act No. 8282, "The Social Security Program provides a package of benefits in the event of death, disability, sickness, maternity, and old age. Basically, the Social Security System (SSS) provides for a replacement of income lost on account of the aforementioned contingencies." A worker, whether regular or casually employed is entitled to these benefits.
2. PhilHealth benefits
  - According to Republic Act No. 7875, as amended by Republic Act No. 9241, "The National Health Insurance Program (NHIP), formerly known as Medicare, is a health insurance program for SSS members and their dependents whereby the healthy subsidize the sick who may find themselves in need of financial assistance when they get hospitalized." Employees of the public and private sector are covered by these benefits.

== See also ==
- Labor policy in the Philippines
- Philippine legal codes
