= Panay Liberation Day =

Public holiday in Panay, Guimaras, and Romblon. Philippines

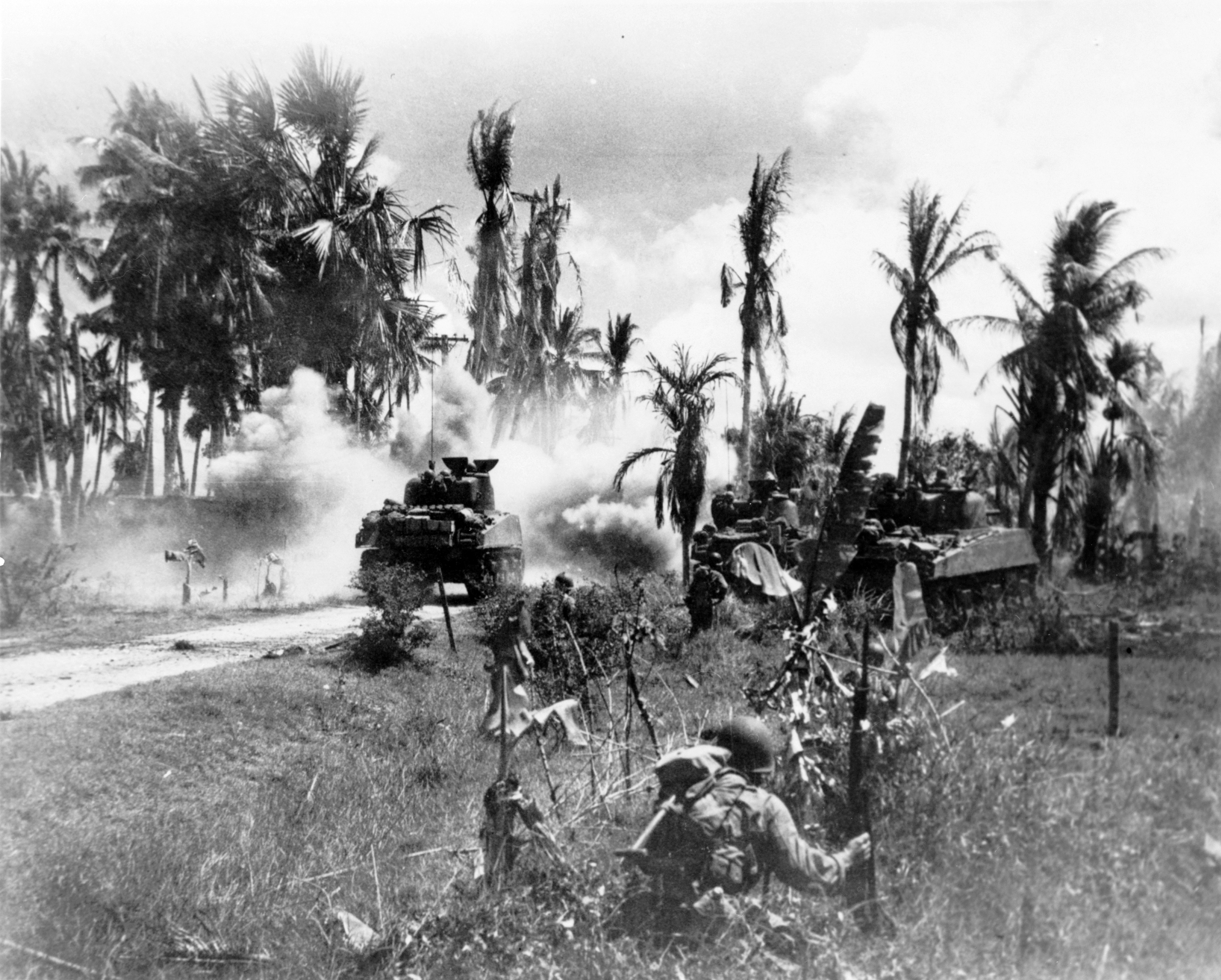
- Troops of the 185th Inf., 40th Div., take cover behind advancing tanks while moving up on Japanese positions on Panay on March 18, 1945. This photo was taken by Lt. Robert Fields who was killed shortly after.
- Official name: Victory (Liberation) Day in Panay, Guimaras, and Romblon
- Observed by: Panay, Guimaras, and Romblon
- Type: Local patriotic
- Date: 18 March
- Next time: 18 March 2027
- Frequency: annual

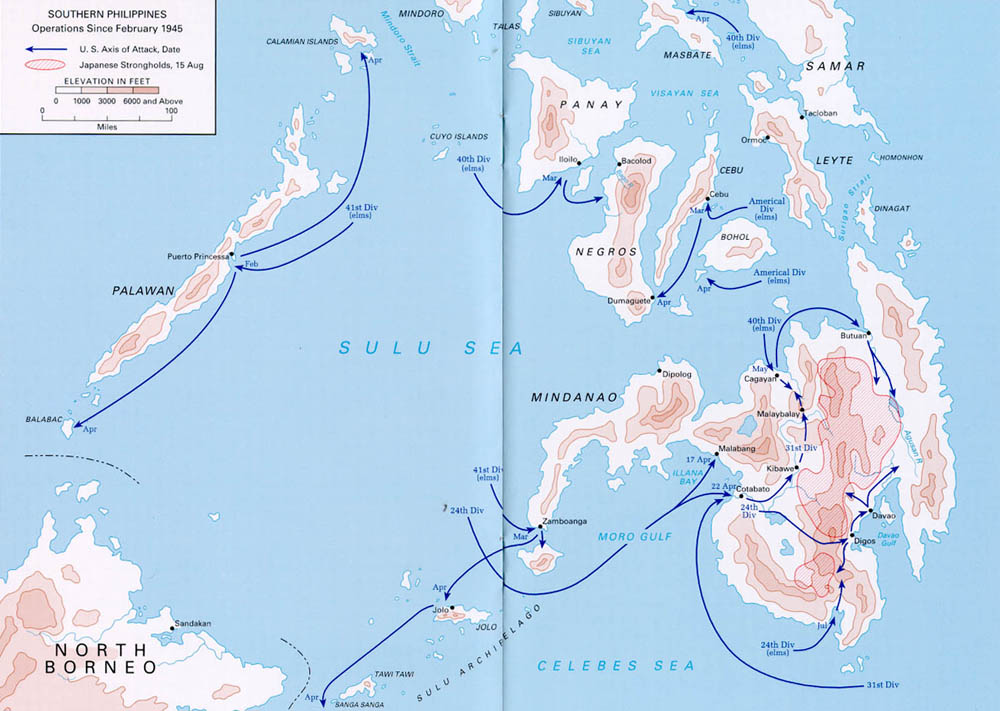
Map of U.S. operations in Southern Philippines, 1945.

Panay Liberation Day, alternatively Panay Landing Day and Victory (Liberation) Day on Panay is an annual event that commemorates the landing on Panay during the Battle of the Visayas in World War II. It is a public holiday on the islands of Panay and Guimaras in Western Visayas and Romblon in Mimaropa.

In 1989, then-President Corazon Aquino issued Proclamation No. 430 or "An Act Declaring March 18 of every year as Victory Day in the Islands of Panay and Romblon including the cities of Iloilo and Roxas", declaring it a special non-working holiday for the three islands. The proclamation said in part, "March 18, 1945 is of great historical and sentimental significance to both the veterans and the people of Panay and Romblon because it was the day when the Panay Guerilla Forces launched the final assault on the Japanese Imperial Armed Forces," Guimaras is included in the proclamation since it was part of Iloilo province in 1989.

== Background ==
On December 8, 1941, several hours after the Empire of Japan launched the Attack on Pearl Harbor, they attacked the American colony of the Philippines, eventually defeating the combined American and Philippine forces and beginning nearly four years of Japanese occupation.

On October 20, 1944, American and Filipino forces led by General Douglas MacArthur landed on Leyte during the Battle of Leyte liberating the island of Leyte and beginning the successful Philippines campaign of 1944–1945.

As part of that campaign, the Battle of the Visayas began on March 18, 1945 with the Allied landing at Tigbauan, Iloilo on Panay.

== Panay landing ==
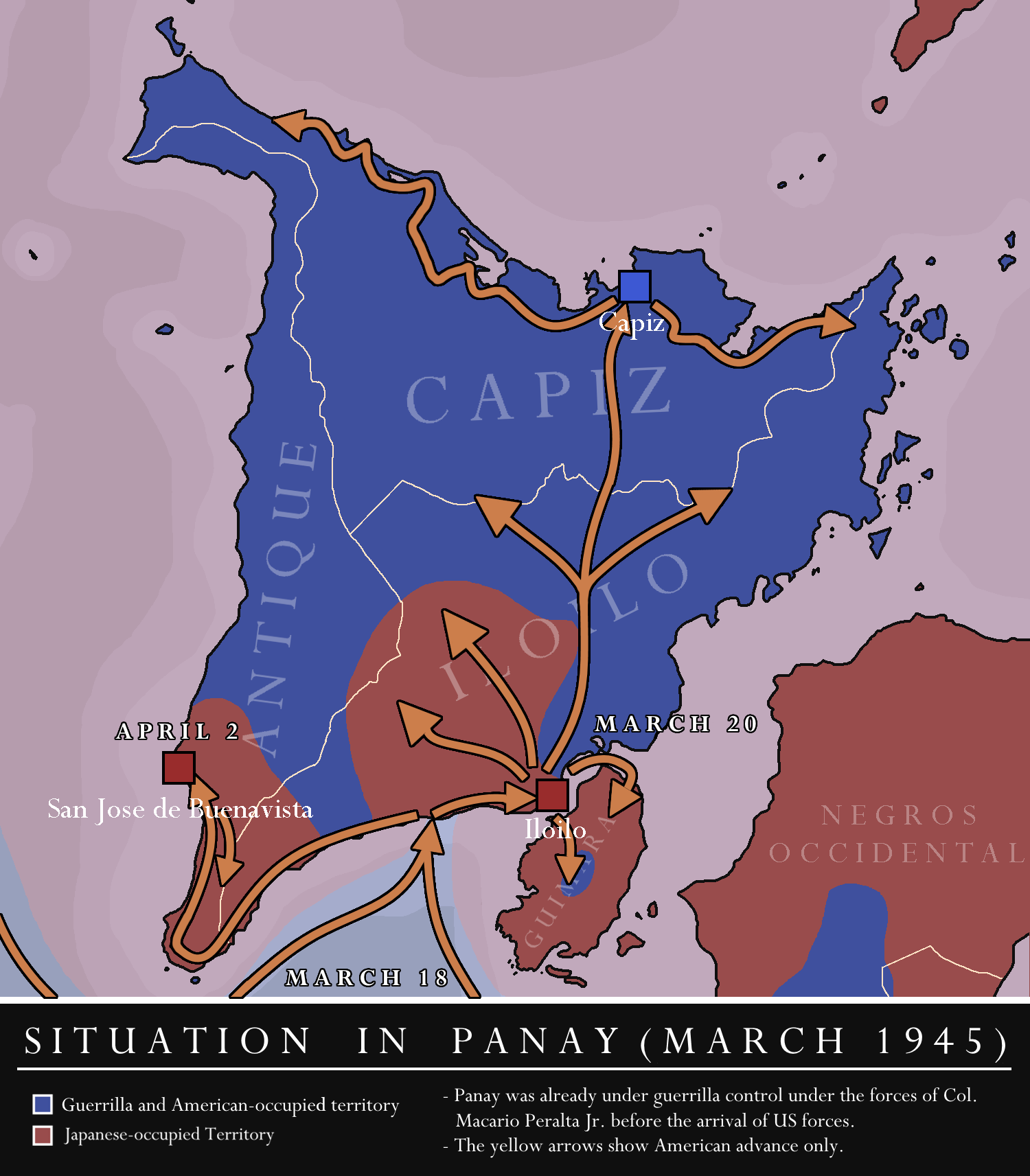
Map of Panay before the landing of US forces on March 18, 1945.

The area of operations for the Battle of the Visayas was divided in two because of the mountainous terrain of Negros Island. The planners chose to seize the western portion, including northwestern Negros and Panay island, during Operation VICTOR I. Lt. Gen. Robert L. Eichelberger, the Eighth Army commander, appointed the 40th Infantry Division, a California National Guard formation and veterans of the recent Battle of Luzon, under Maj. Gen. Rapp Brush, with the 503rd Airborne Regimental Combat Team in reserve. Panay Island was the first objective.

On 18 March 1945, after two weeks of aerial bombardment of Japanese positions, the 40th Infantry Division, spearheaded by the 185th Infantry Regiment, landed unopposed at Tigbauan, several miles south of Iloilo City. A 23,000-strong guerrilla force under Col. Macario Peralta had secured most of Panay. Gen. Eichelberger recalled, "Filipino guerrillas stood stiff, resplendent in starched khaki uniforms and ornaments and decked in battle gear". Lt. Charles Stewart said "An interesting incident occurred during the Panay invasion. The landing was several miles from Ioilo City and I flew up to the city on reconnaissance. After circling the city a few times I noticed a group of people had come down to the beach, waving at us. They had printed in large letters in the sand, "Japs are gone." I radioed that good news back to the USS Cleveland. I imagine the troops walking up the road toward Ioilo City still took precautions." This video on YouTube of the Panay landing taken by the Army Pictorial Service shows the unopposed landing and march into Iloilo City. The regiment proceeded to seize airfields at Mandurriao, Iloilo City, and at Cabatuan, Iloilo which was located in the now Iloilo International Airport at Cabatuan, Iloilo.

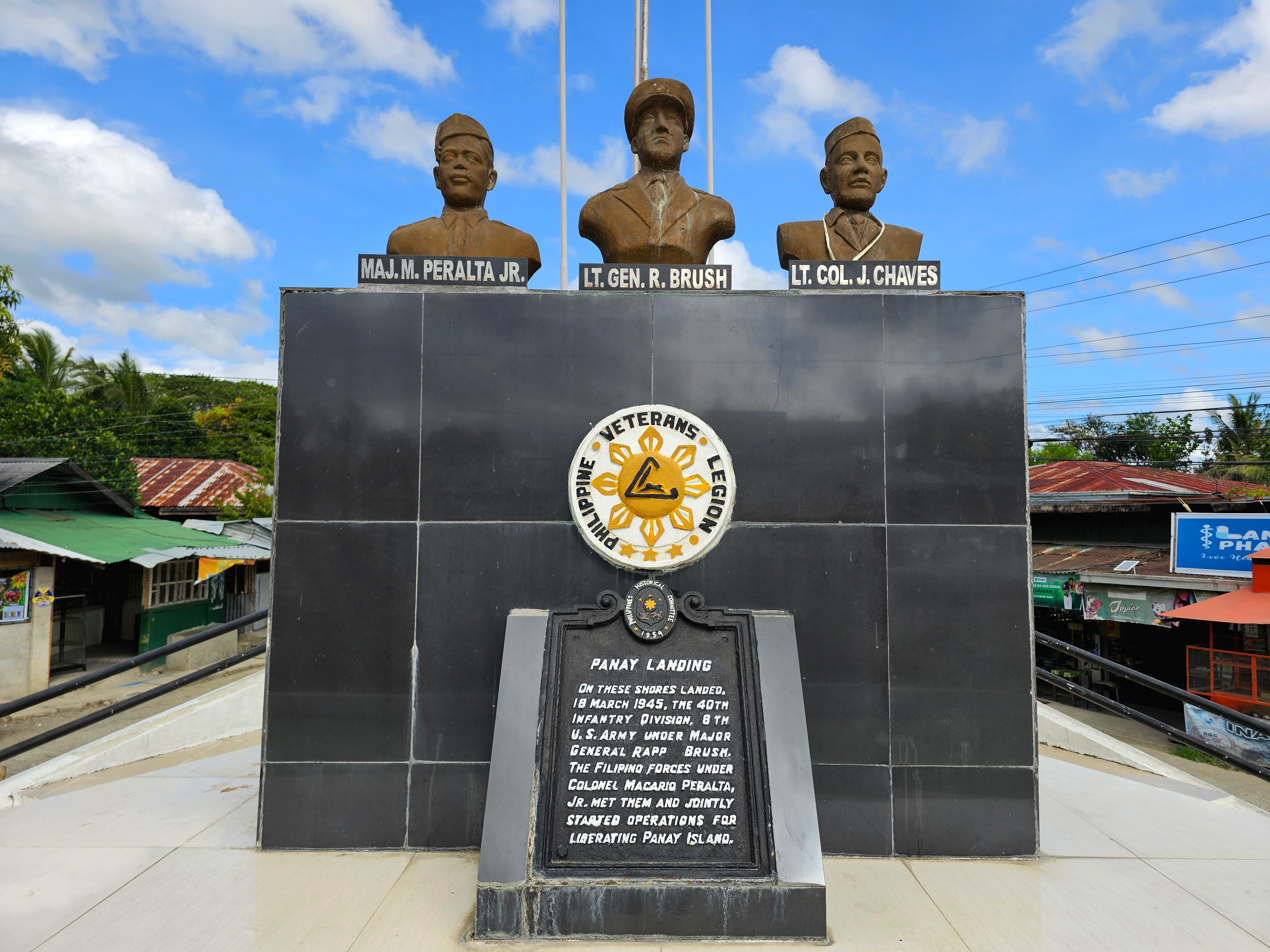
War memorial in Tigbauan, Iloilo, commemorating the landing of American forces on the island of Panay

The Japanese were concentrated in Iloilo City proper, and the 40th Division in two days easily defeated these Japanese outposts. Mopping up operations by the guerrillas and 2nd Battalion of the 160th Infantry Regiment continued, and at war's end, some 1,500 Japanese troops surrendered.

Guimaras and Inampulugan islands, between Panay and Negros, were seized on the same day that Iloilo fell, 20 March, and the next day, respectively with no opposition.

Overall, the Visayas operations of the U.S. Eighth Army suffered relatively light casualties in comparison to Japanese figures. The 40th Division on Panay and northeastern Negros suffered 390 killed and 1,025 wounded with the Japanese sustaining 4,080 killed with another 3,300 succumbed to disease and starvation.

Lt. Col. Ryoichi Tozuka, the commander of the Imperial Japanese Army in Panay Island, signed the document of surrender at Cabatuan Airfield, located in Cabatuan, Iloilo, Panay Island, Philippines, on September 2, 1945, the same day as the surrender signing in Japan aboard the U.S.S. Missouri. This was accepted by Col. Raymond G. Stanton, commanding the 160th U.S. Infantry regiment, and was attended by Rear Admiral Ralph O. Davis, commanding the U.S. Navy's 13th Amphibious Group, and by Brig. Gen. Donald J. Myers, comdg the 40th Infantry Division. The 13th Amphibious Group was tasked to transport the 40th U.S. Infantry Division to Korea.

== Celebrations ==
Most years the main ceremony is at the Balantang Memorial Cemetery National Shrine in Barangay Quintin Salas, Jaro, Iloilo City, a veterans cemetery and the burial place of the guerrilla leader Col. Macario Peralta. The cemetery is the only military cemetery established outside Metro Manila. The celebrations are organized every year by the Sixth Military District World War II Veterans Association, Inc..

== See also ==
- Public holidays in the Philippines
