= Lopez Jaena Day =

Public holiday in Philippines

López Jaena Day
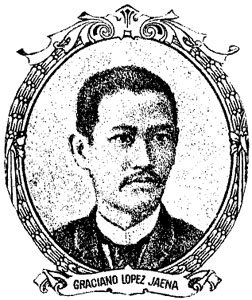
- Image of López Jaena from the book "Mga Dakilang Pilipino" by Jose N. Sevilla
- Official name: Birth Anniversary of Graciano Lopez Jaena
- Observed by: Iloilo province & Iloilo City
- Type: Local patriotic
- Date: December 18
- Next time: 18 December 2025
- Frequency: annual

Lopez Jaena Day is a public holiday to celebrate the birth of Philippine national hero Graciano López Jaena. It was declared a holiday by the Philippine National Government only for Iloilo Province and Iloilo City.

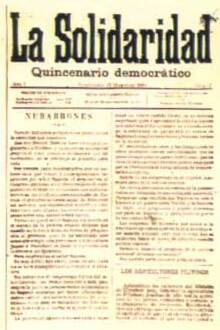
Lopez Jaena's newspaper

== Background ==
López Jaena was born in the Jaro district in now Iloilo City and spent most of his life there, before sailing to Spain in 1879. While in Jaro, he wrote Fray Botod a short story critical of the current Spanish colonial government. However, his real fame came in Spain when he teamed up with others advocating for reform, including Marcelo H. del Pilar and José Rizal, and became a leader of the so-called ilustrados and of the Propaganda Movement. His newspaper La Solidaridad was particularly influential.

He died in 1896 of tuberculosis, before the outbreak of the Philippine Revolution.

== Recognition ==
In 1970, Republic Act 6155 declared his birth an official public holiday in Iloilo province and the independent Iloilo City. It is marked every year in Jaro with the Graciano Lopez Jaena Foundation Inc taking a lead role. As part of the celebrations, a wreath is laid every year at the Graciano López Jaena Park, commonly known as Jaro Plaza, where there is also a statue.

== See also ==
- Public holidays in the Philippines
