= National Hero of the Philippines =

Award

A National Hero of the Philippines is a Filipino who has been recognized as a national hero for their role in the history of the Philippines. Loosely, the term may refer to all historical figures recognized as heroes, but the term more strictly refers to those officially designated as such. In 1995 the Philippine National Heroes Committee officially recommended several people for the designation, but this was not acted upon. As of 2003, no one had ever been officially recognized as a Philippine National Hero.

The reformist writer José Rizal, today considered as the quintessential national hero, has never been explicitly proclaimed as such by the Philippine government. Besides Rizal, the only other Filipino currently given implied recognition as a national hero is Andrés Bonifacio, based on the Philippine government's policy on national holidays. While other historical figures are commemorated in public municipal or provincial holidays, only Rizal and Andrés Bonifacio are commemorated in full or "regular" national holidays. The National Heroes Committee recommended José Rizal, Andres Bonifacio, Emilio Aguinaldo, Apolinario Mabini, Marcelo H. del Pilar, Sultan Dipatuan Kudarat, Juan Luna, Melchora Aquino, and Gabriela Silang to be recognized as national heroes on November 15, 1995. No action was taken on the recommendation.

== Criteria ==
According to the 1995 technical committee National Heroes shall be:

- Those who have a concept of nation and thereafter aspire and struggle for the nation's freedom.
- Those who define and contribute to a system or life of freedom and order for a nation. Heroes are those who make the nation's constitution and laws.
- Heroes are those who contribute to the quality of life and destiny of a nation.

Three more criteria were added in 1995:

- A hero is part of the people's expression. But the process of a people's internalization of a hero's life and works takes time, with the youth forming a part of the internalization.
- A hero thinks of the future, especially the future generations.
- The choice of a hero involves not only the recounting of an episode or events in history, but of the entire process that made this particular person a hero.

== History ==
=== 1890s ===
Already admired in his lifetime for his nationalistic writings and activities, José Rizal was executed for treason on December 30, 1896, by the Spanish colonial government. His writings had helped inspire the Philippine Revolution against colonial rule. On December 20, 1898, Emilio Aguinaldo, president of the Philippine government, decreed that December 30 of every year would be commemorated as Rizal Day, a day of national mourning in honor of Rizal and other victims of the revolution.

=== 1900s ===
By the start of the 20th century, the Philippines had become a protectorate of the United States. Rizal was given special attention as a hero by the American occupational administration because, unlike more radical figures whose ideas could inspire resistance against American rule, he was considered to represent peaceful political advocacy. Rizal was selected over the revolutionaries Andres Bonifacio, who was viewed as too radical, and Apolinario Mabini, who was considered unregenerate. In June 1901, Act No. 137 of the Taft Commission reorganized the district of Morong into the Province of Rizal.

=== 1910s ===
On February 23, 1918, the Philippine Legislature issued Act No. 2760 which promoted the creation, maintenance, and improvement of national monuments, particularly the creation of a monument in memory of Andres Bonifacio, leader of the Katipunan secret society which spearheaded the Philippine Revolution.

=== 1920s ===
On February 16, 1921, the Philippine Legislature enacted Act No. 2946, which made November 30 of each year a legal holiday to commemorate the birth of Andres Bonifacio, henceforth called Bonifacio Day.

=== 1930s ===
On October 28, 1931, the Philippine Legislature enacted Act No. 3827, declaring the last Sunday of August of every year as National Heroes Day.

=== 1960s ===
By 1960, Rizal was already held in such esteem that he was referred to as the Philippine national hero, even though no legislation had been passed making it official. That year, historian Teodoro Agoncillo wrote in his History of the Filipino People that the Philippine national hero, unlike those of other countries, was not "the leader of its liberation forces". Agoncillo noted the sentiments of certain quarters calling for Rizal's replacement as the national hero by Andres Bonifacio, since Rizal was interpreted as ultimately a reformist content to be under Spain, not a revolutionary wishing for independence like Emilio Aguinaldo who was elected President of the Revolutionary Government and Generalissimo of the National Liberation Forces. Agoncillo opined that Bonifacio should not replace Rizal as the national hero but be honored alongside him.

=== 1970s ===
Historian Renato Constantino, building upon sentiments noted by Agoncillo, wrote in his 1970 essay Veneration Without Understanding that Rizal was unworthy of his high status since he was a "United States-sponsored hero".

=== 1990s ===
In 1990, historian Ambeth Ocampo stated that Rizal was a "conscious hero", i.e., he had projected himself as a national figure prior to his execution and he was deemed as the national hero by Bonifacio, who even named Rizal as the honorary president of the Katipunan, long before Rizal was praised by the American occupational administrators.

President Fidel V. Ramos formed the National Heroes Committee on March 28, 1993, under Executive Order No. 75, titled "Creating the National Heroes Committee Under the Office of the President". The National Heroes Committee was tasked to study, evaluate and recommend Filipino national heroes to recognize their heroic character and remarkable achievements for the country.

On November 30, 1994 (Bonifacio Day), President Ramos issued Proclamation No. 510 which declared the year 1996 (the centennial of the Philippine Revolution) as the Year of Filipino Heroes.

The National Heroes Committee recommended the following nine individuals to be recognized as national heroes on November 15, 1995:

- José Rizal
- Andres Bonifacio
- Emilio Aguinaldo
- Apolinario Mabini
- Marcelo H. del Pilar
- Muhammad Dipatuan Kudarat
- Juan Luna
- Melchora Aquino
- Gabriela Silang

Their report was submitted to the Department of Education, Culture and Sports on November 22 of that year. However, no action was taken afterwards. It was speculated that any action might cause a number of requests for proclamation or trigger debates that revolve around the controversies about the concerned historical figures.

=== 2000s ===
On July 24, 2007, President Gloria Macapagal Arroyo approved Republic Act No. 9256, which declared the Monday nearest August 21 a nationwide special holiday in honor of Senator Benigno Aquino Jr., called Ninoy Aquino Day. August 21 is Aquino's death anniversary. On the same date President Macapagal-Arroyo also approved Republic Act No. 9492, which decreed that National Heroes Day be celebrated on the last Monday of August, Bonifacio Day on the Monday nearest November 30, and Rizal Day on the Monday nearest December 30.

Following the death of President Corazon "Cory" Aquino on August 1, 2009, two resolutions, House Joint Resolution Nos. 41 and 42, were filed proposing her official recognition as a national hero with her birth date, January 25, as Cory Aquino Day.

== Gallery ==
Some of the persons selected for recommendation as national heroes:

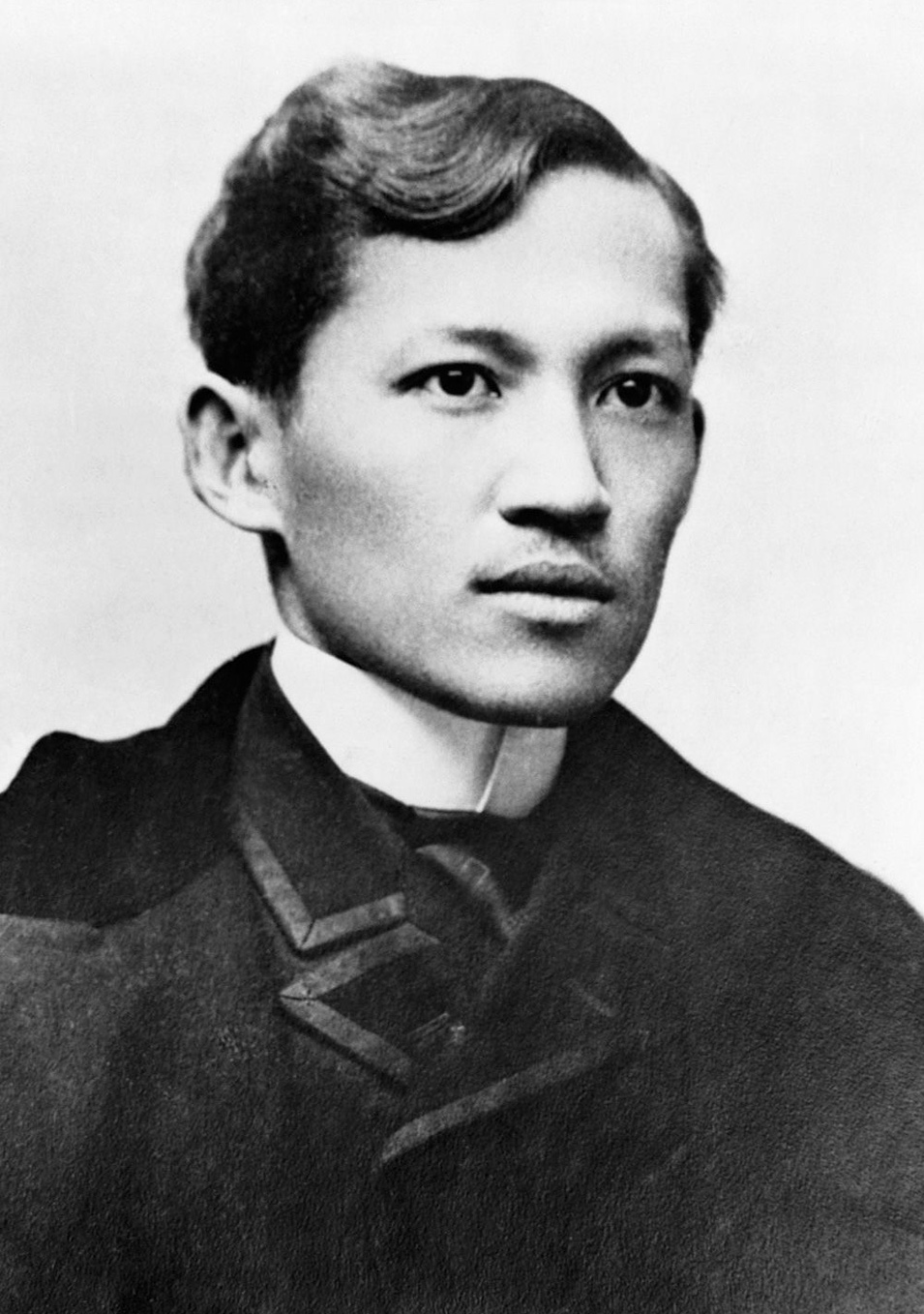
José Rizal

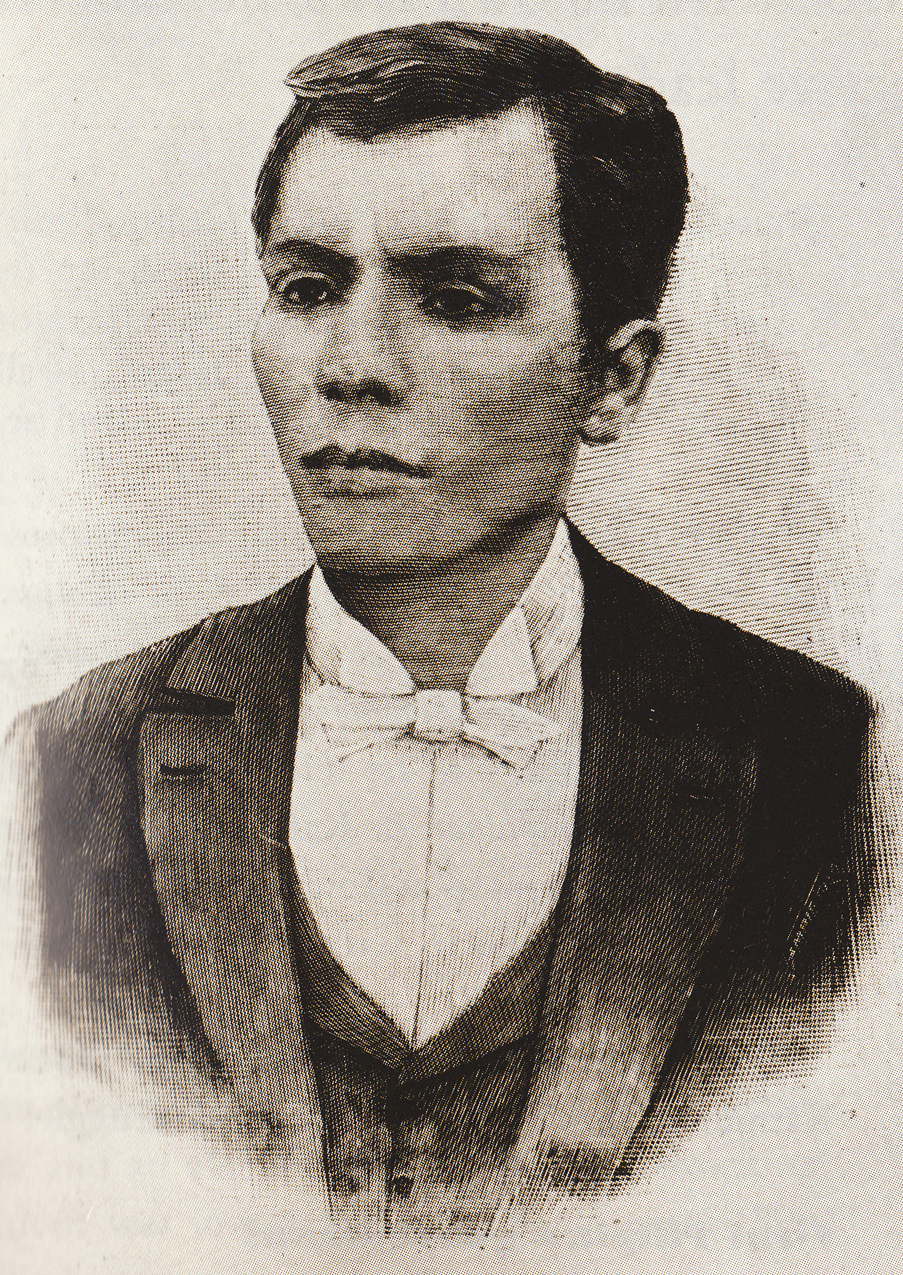
Andres Bonifacio

Emilio Aguinaldo

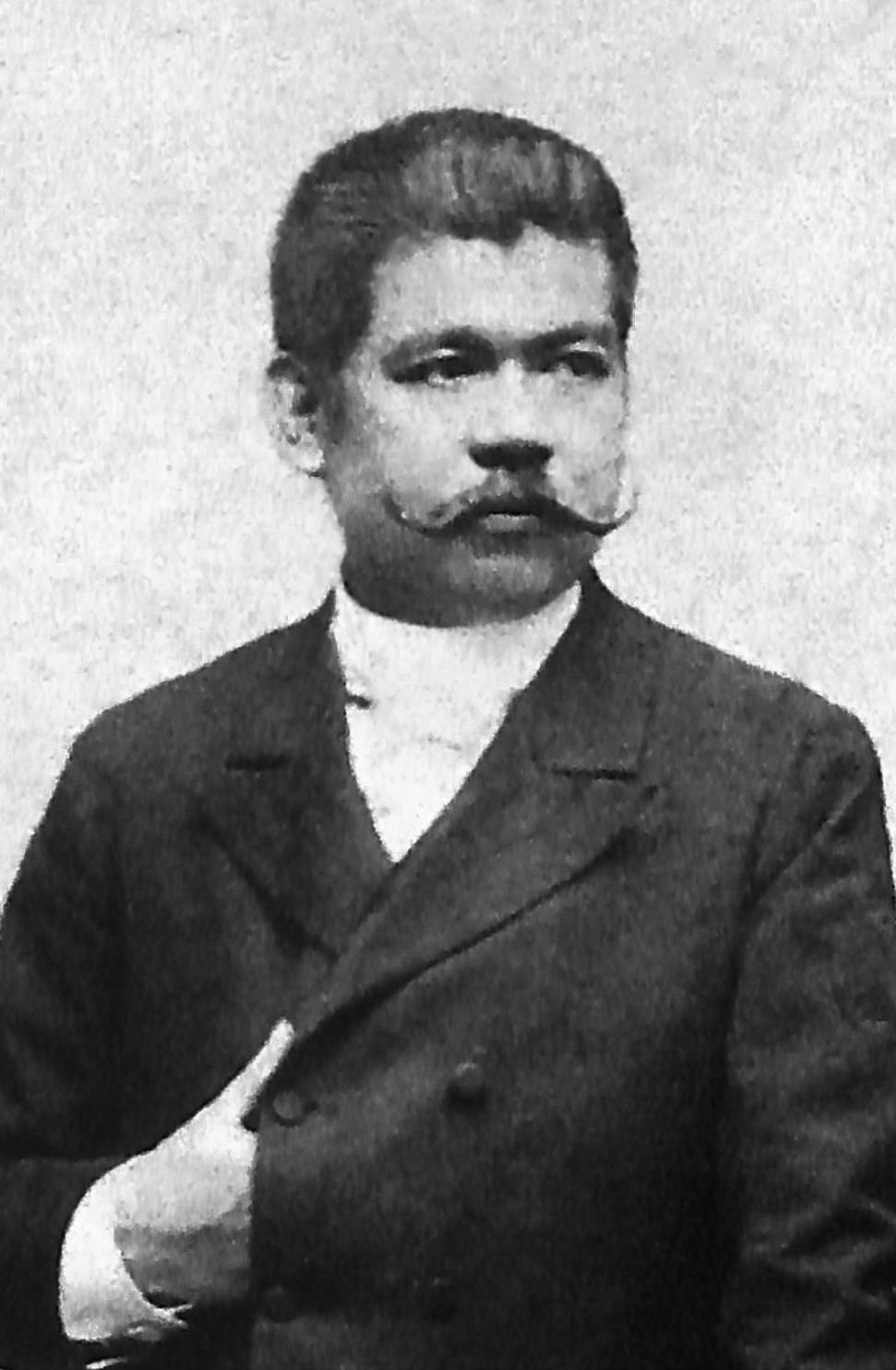
Marcelo H. del Pilar

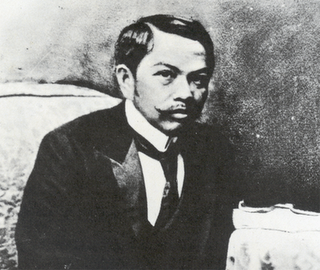
Juan Luna

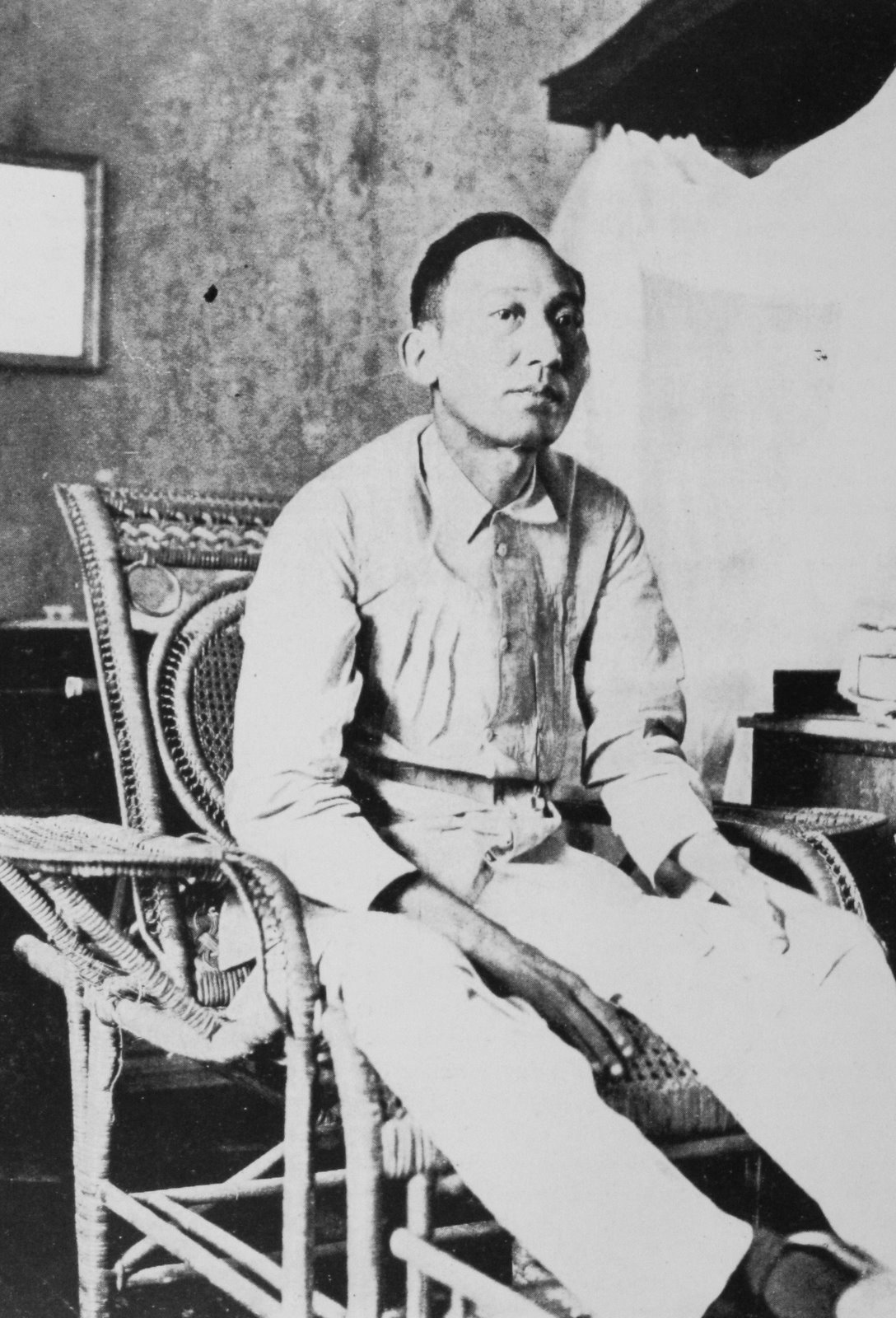
Apolinario Mabini

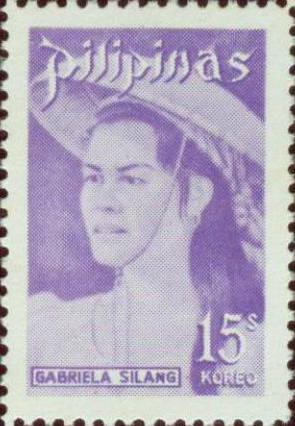
Gabriela Silang

== See also ==
- Public holidays in the Philippines
