= Thirteenth salary =

Legal requirement to pay workers an additional salary at the end of the calendar year

13th salary mandatory 14th salary mandatory 13th salary customary 14th salary customary

A thirteenth salary, or end-of-year bonus, is an extra payment sometimes given to employees at the end of December. Although the amount of the payment depends on several factors, it usually matches an employee's monthly salary and can be paid in one or more installments (depending on the country). The thirteenth salary is most prominent in Latin America, where this payment is mandatory in most countries. In countries where the bonus is required by law, all employees usually receive it if they have worked for the company for a certain required amount of time. However, freelancers and contract workers are often not entitled to the 13th-month pay. Employees who have not worked for the company for a year often receive a prorated amount.

== History ==
In Italy, the thirteenth-month bonus was initially named gratifica natalizia ('Christmas bonus'), and was a customary, but not obligatory, bonus given by employers to their employees before the Christmastide. It was legalized in the 1937 collective labour agreement for factory labour, and was extended to all jobs in 1946 and then by presidential decree in 1960.

In the Philippines the thirteenth salary was legalized in December 1975 when President Ferdinand Marcos issued Presidential Decree No. 851, ordering employers to pay a thirteenth salary to improve the situation to employees who are earning less than 1,000 pesos per month (at that time a significant sum). The decree notably excluded employees of the government and its instruments. With the removal of Marcos, his successor Corazon Aquino removed the 1,000-peso limit in 1986, giving all private sector employees the privilege. Two years later, Aquino signed Republic Act No. 6686, extending the thirteenth salary to government employees.

Compensation based on annual work was paid in addition to the basic salary based on the decision of the Central Committee of the Communist Party of the Soviet Union and the Council of Ministers of the USSR on 4 October 1965 ("On improving planning and enhancing economic incentives for industrial production"). Paid from the material incentive fund, the administration determined the amount of funds in conjunction with the Central Committee. If a company fulfilled (or exceeded) annual plans to sell products (or profits) and estimated profitability, the thirteenth salary could be paid from funds earmarked in the budget and other cash reserves. A reduced amount was paid if a company did not meet the targets.

In Switzerland, the 13th-month salary began to impose itself at the end of the 1960s, although it had started to spread before that. There were conflicts about the payment schedule: workers wanted regular payments, and employers were more comfortable with yearly or half-yearly payments.

Many employers, such as the Swiss Broadcasting Corporation, decided to implement the 13th month salary to appear more attractive to skilled candidates.

In Mauritius, the 13th month salary was implemented in December 1975, but there were many battles to achieve this goal. Every trade union centre, like the Federation of Civil Service Unions, had to fight together, using street campaigns and work stoppages. Around the 1970s, the price of sugar skyrocketed, but some companies in the sugar industry did not want to pay employees a 13th-month salary or bonus. From 1973 onwards, under pressure from the Sugar Industry Staff Employees Association (SISEA), a group of executives were made to sign an agreement stating that a 13th-month salary or bonus would be paid based on the yearly profits. However, for every industry other than the sugar industry, workers at that time could not benefit from a 13th-month salary. This led to more protests in the streets. In 1975, with the help of Cyril Canabady, a lawyer, the government finally stated that every employer would have to pay a 13th-month salary.

In Brazil, the 13th salary, known as Gratificação de Natal aos Trabalhadores, was initially instituted by President João Goulart in 1962. The legislation, authored by Aarão Steinbruch, had been proposed three years earlier in 1959. The rationale behind the proposal was that companies were already used to providing bonuses to employees during the Christmas season, and the law would formalize a practice prevalent among private sector employees. However, due to opposition and pressure from businesses, who argued that the proposal would result in financial losses for companies and potential job cuts, the discussion of the proposal took three years. Additionally, the political turmoil in Brazil during the 1960s contributed to the extended debate. Since its implementation, the 13th salary has been a tool for boosting the economy, ensuring high sales volumes for the industry at the end of the year.

In Mexico, the law requiring a 13th salary was established through the Federal Work Law (Spanish: Ley Federal del Trabajo), which was enacted in 1930 to enhance and protect workers' rights, benefits, payroll services, and social security. The law was revised in 1970 to incorporate a yearly 13th payment requirement, paid around the Christmas holiday.

== Details ==
Several countries followed the Philippines, enacting similar thirteenth-salary laws, and some have passed laws about fourteenth- and fifteenth-month pay. Some regions have a compulsory fourteenth salary. Brazil has a mandatory fourteenth-month salary, which is treated as a holiday bonus.

In countries where the 13th salary is prominent, it is typically mandatory, customary, or included in collective agreements. While a 14th salary is also mandatory in some countries, it is less widespread than the 13th salary.

The payment varies by country. Some have one payment at the end of the year, and others pay in two installments: one in the year's first half and the other at the end of the year. This could motivate people to travel or otherwise enjoy summer holidays. Corporations that fail to make the payments may be fined.

== Taxation ==
The thirteenth salary is normally tax-exempt, although some countries have restrictions; it could be taxable if the payment exceeds one month's salary. The taxation also often depends on how the payment is classified in the specific country. If it is considered to be a mandatory salary, it is treated as such and is taxable. When considered a bonus, it is usually not taxable unless the amount reaches a certain limit. The tax laws do, however, vary from country to country.

== Computation ==
The computation of a 13th salary varies from country to country. Nevertheless, the amount usually equals the total annual pay divided by 12 or is expressed as one month's salary. The payment is calculated similarly if the country also has a mandatory 14th salary. In some countries, the total annual payment is divided into 13 or 14 parts. Not all workers are guaranteed this amount; however, most people receive at least 15 days' wages in Mexico.

== Prevalence ==
=== Europe ===
==== Mandatory ====
- Armenia: paid before the New Year holidays
- Greece: 14th-month and holiday bonuses are paid on Christmas, Easter, and summer vacation
- Italy: In Italy, the payment is referred to as tredicesima and is paid around the Christmas holiday. The thirteenth monthly salary is not a bonus but a delayed payment. All employees, including public and private workers, as well as retirees and employees on maternity leave, fall under the delayed payment. However, this payment structure is not foreseen to certain workers such as interns, independent professionals, self-employed individuals, external staff, or project workers. The payment is subject to tax and security deductions. An employee is entitled to a prorated thirteenth salary if they leave their employer before the end of the calendar year, unless the parties to the employment contract have agreed otherwise. In the case of retirees, the amount is calculated similarly.
- Portugal: 13th-month paid in summer vacation and 14th-month at Christmas.
- Spain: mandatory 14th-month bonuses (pagas extraordinarias) paid in summer and at Christmas. They can be prorated into the twelve monthly salaries.

==== Customary ====
- Austria: End of June; a 14th-month bonus is paid at the end of November.
- Belgium: Paid at the end of the year; mandatory holiday bonus
- Croatia: Paid at Christmas or Easter or both, referred to as "Christmas bonus" and "Easter bonus" respectively
- Czech Republic, France, Luxembourg, Slovakia and Switzerland: Paid at the end of the year
- Czech Republic: The 13th month salary is not mandatory, but employers will commonly offer it depending on the worker's performance.
- Cyprus: The 13th-month salary is not written in the law, but it is a common practise, and employers cannot change their habits of offering it. It is received before Christmas.
- Slovakia: 27% of all employees receive a Christmas bonus, and 17% receive a 13th-month salary. Telecommunication, banking, and finance employees may be paid more than the average 13th-month salary.
- Finland: Paid in summer, usually 50 – 60% of monthly salary
- Germany: Paid before Christmas
- Italy: The annual salary can further be divided in 14 instalments and may be paid in June to those workers who qualify according to their national collective contract. The 13th month salary is called (gratifica natalizia) when it is awarded to factory or manual workers. Moreover, employees who have worked many years in the same company, managers, and executives are usually offered a 14th-month salary during the summer. Ulterior division of the annual salary like the 15th or 16th-month salary, even if scarcer, can also be provided in the petroleum and banking industries.
- Netherlands: paid in November or December
- France: The 13th-month salary is not written in the law, but it is a common practise, and employers cannot change their habits of offering it. It is received at the end of the year, at Christmas, or eventually in several payments. Generally, it is received twice: a first payment in June and a second in December. However, workers can also obtain it quarterly or monthly. To calculate it, firms simply chose to give a month's salary. Exceptions are made if the employee did not work all year in the company; in this case, the bonus is calculated in proportion to the number of hours. Some companies can apply some seniority conditions to allocate the 13th salary.
- Slovenia: Paid in December, often referred to as the "Christmas bonus". In 2025, the government expressed support for and took steps towards making the 13th salary mandatory. The mandatory amount to be paid would be half of a minimum wage salary.

==== Germany ====
In Germany, a legal distinction is made between a thirteenth salary and a Christmas bonus; in most other countries, the terms are used interchangeably. The Christmas bonus (usually paid with the November salary) is intended to pay additional holiday expenses and retain employees. An employer pays the thirteenth salary for ongoing work at the end of a calendar year. An employee is entitled to a prorated thirteenth salary if they leave their employer before the end of the calendar year, unless the parties to the employment contract have agreed otherwise.

Special payments for regular work performance (a requirement fulfilled by the thirteenth salary, and the Christmas bonus in certain cases) can be counted towards the minimum wage. For example, a person works full-time and earns €8.03 per hour until a minimum wage of €8.50 per hour is introduced. Their employment contract stipulates that they are entitled to a half-month Christmas bonus and an annual holiday payment, totaling one month's salary. To meet the minimum wage of €8.50 (required by law in Germany since January 2015), the employer consolidates the holiday payment and Christmas bonus and pays one-twelfth of the amount to the employee every month. The employee's hourly wage would increase to €8.69, meeting the minimum wage.

The Christmas bonus is part of the other-remuneration category, under §39b Abs. 3 of the EStG. The Christmas tax allowance was abolished with the Tax Reform Act of 25 July 1988. Since July 2008, federal officials have no longer received Christmas bonuses; the special payments (Christmas and holiday bonuses), amounting to five percent of the annual salary, were integrated into the officials' base salary.

==== Switzerland ====
Most Swiss employers pay their employees' annual salary in 13 instalments rather than 12. An employee usually receives two months' salary in December, which helps pay end-of-year and holiday bills. However, they sometimes receive half in July and half in December, similar to Germany's Christmas bonus and holiday payment. The thirteenth monthly salary is not a bonus but a delayed payment. Whether or not a thirteenth salary is part of an employment contract, some companies pay a higher monthly salary instead of the additional payment. The thirteenth salary is prorated for partial years in the first and last years of employment.

Some employers pay an additional annual bonus based on employee performance or employer profits. When an employee pays direct income tax and the 13th month's salary and bonus are paid in the same month, a higher tax rate is paid.

=== Latin America ===
In Latin America, the thirteenth salary is commonly known as aguinaldo or prima in Spanish ('bonus').

==== Mandatory ====
- Argentina: two equal instalments, by 30 June and 18 December. The amount of each of these payments is equal to half of the highest monthly wage in the preceding six months.
- Bolivia: tax-free, up to one month's wages. A 14th-month bonus is mandatory as a holiday bonus if GDP growth is over 4.5 percent.
- Brazil: paid in two equal parts, typically by 30 November and 20 December. A mandatory 14th-month bonus is called a "holiday bonus" and is paid in the subsequent month. It is one-twelfth of the wage paid in December per month worked previously or equal to the December wage. It is paid in full only to those who have worked for at least one year for the same company. Those who have worked less time will receive it proportionally to the amount worked.
- Colombia: two-halves, paid during the first 15 days of June and the first 20 days of December
- Costa Rica: paid during the first 20 days of December
- Dominican Republic: formally known as Regalía Pascual and commonly referred to as Doble Sueldo (Double Pay) which by law must be paid by 20 December. It is tax-exempt.
- Mexico: The 13th salary, in Mexico, referred to as aguinaldo, must be equivalent to at least 15 days of wages. However, the bonus amount is prorated for workers who have been employed for less than a year in the same company. Employers who fail to comply with this regulation can be reported to the Federal Office of the Defense of Labor. Unfortunately, only a small fraction of Mexican workers receive the aguinaldo due to unfavourable conditions such as informal contracts and temporary payments. It is paid by 20 December.
- Ecuador: A mandatory 14th-month bonus is paid in parts or a lump sum.
- El Salvador: Christmas bonus based on years of service
- Guatemala: paid at mid-year. A mandatory 14th-month bonus is paid at the end of the year; both are equal to one month's salary.
- Honduras: paid in December. A mandatory 14th-month bonus is paid in July; both equal one month's salary.
- Nicaragua: one month's salary, paid by 10 December
- Panama: paid in three equal parts on 15 April 15 August, and 15 December
- Peru: paid in July. A mandatory 14th-month bonus is paid in December.
- Uruguay: paid in two-halves, on 30 June and by the end of the year
- Paraguay, Venezuela: paid at the end of the year
- Puerto Rico: In Puerto Rico, the mandatory payment is called the Christmas Bonus and is paid between 15 October and 15 December. Regarding employees hired before 26 January 2017, the employer must pay a bonus to those who have worked at least 700 hours during the 12 months starting from 1 October of the previous year. Employers with over 15 employees pay 6% of an employee's total salary; the maximum bonus is $600. Employers with fewer employees pay 3% of an employee's total salary; the maximum bonus is $300. Regarding employees hired after 26 January 2017, employers with more than 20 employees are required to pay a bonus equivalent to 2% of the total salary, capped at $600, to those who have worked at least 1350 hours in the 12 months starting from 1 October of the previous year. Employers with fewer employees must also pay a bonus equivalent to 2% of the total salary, capped at $300. The bonus may be reduced to 50% for employees who worked less than a year for the company. Puerto Rico Act No. 41 of 20 June 2022, further regulating employment law, including the mandatory Christmas bonus, was appealed in March 2023.

==== Customary ====
- Chile: paid in December or two halves, in September and December

=== Asia ===
==== Mandatory ====
- India: In India, certain categories of employees are eligible for a bonus regulated by the Payment of Bonus Act, 1965. All factories and establishments with 20 or more employees are mandated to comply with the act. However, establishments with ten or more employees can also be required to comply with the act. Employees who have worked for 30 or more days in the relevant accounting year and whose monthly salary is Rs. 21000 or less are entitled to the bonus. If an employee's salary is higher than Rs. 7000 per month or the minimum wage, whichever is greater, the bonus calculation is based on either Rs. 7,000 or the minimum wage, whichever is higher. The minimum bonus that the employer is required to provide is 8.33% of the employee's salary earned during the accounting year, and the maximum bonus that the employer can provide is 20% of the salary earned during the accounting year. The bonus is paid within eight months from the closing of the accounting year.
- Indonesia: religious-holiday bonus, paid at least one week before the holiday
- Philippines: the Labor Code states this bonus, commonly called "13th month pay", must be paid in sum to employees who have worked for at least a month within the calendar year. Moreover, it should be given out on or before 24 December or in two installments in May and November. Added 14th, 15th, and other bonuses may be given at the employer's discretion. All rank-and-file employees are eligible for the bonus. Whether the payment is taxable depends on the amount received.
- Saudi Arabia: paid on Eid al-Fitr

==== Customary ====
- China: paid during the month of the Lunar New Year or Spring Holiday.
- Hong Kong: paid at the Lunar New Year or the end of the year.
- Israel
- Japan: a summer bonus, paid in June. A 14th-month winter bonus is paid in December.
- Malaysia: paid at the end of the year
- Nepal: paid with the last month's salary before the festival of Dashain.
- Singapore ("Annual Wage Supplement").
- Taiwan: paid at the end of the year.
- United Arab Emirates: A 14th-month bonus is paid at the end of the year.
- Vietnam: paid the month before the Lunar New Year.

=== Africa ===
- Angola: A mandatory vacation bonus is paid before a holiday. A mandatory 14th-month Christmas is paid in December.
- Nigeria: paid before Christmas
- South Africa: paid at the end of the year
- Mauritius: Paid in December

== See also ==
- Christmas bonus (United Kingdom)
- Holiday pay
- Bonus payment
- Performance-related pay
