= Holiday pay =

In some jurisdictions, holiday pay is an allowance which an employee earns through work in the calendar year prior to the year of the holiday. It is usually a percentage supplement to the salary that has been paid the year before the holiday pay is to be paid.

Holiday pay is a legal term in Norway (feriepenger), Sweden (semesterlön), Denmark (feriepenge), Belgium and the Netherlands (vakantiegeld, vakantieuitkering, or pécule de vacances), Germany and Austria (Urlaubsgeld).

== Norwegian law ==
In Norway, the right to holiday pay is established in the Holiday Act of 1988 (ferieloven).

An employee who has not been working the previous year has the right of vacation, but does not have the right of holiday pay. The holiday year (ferieåret) is defined as the year when the employee leaves for holiday. The holiday pay earned in the previous year is paid in connection with the holiday leave the following year, no later than one week before the holiday starts.

The right of holiday pay is linked to the concept of an employee, which means that one performs work in the service of another. Freelancers and self-employed persons are therefore not entitled to holiday pay under the Norwegian Holiday Act.

The holiday pay amounts to 10.2% of the holiday pay basis. Employees who turn 59 years are entitled to 12.5%. Employees covered by a collective agreement that provides a fifth holiday week receive 12% (with employees over the age of 60 years receiving 14.3%).

== Dutch law ==
Holiday pay in the Netherlands was first instituted in 1969. Holiday pay is normally paid in May and typically is calculated as a minimum of 8% of an employee's gross taxable wage, prorated over the number of months worked and subject to income tax deductions.

== See also ==
- Thirteenth salary
- Paid time off
- List of minimum annual leave by country
