= National Heroes Day (Philippines) =

Public holiday in the Philippines

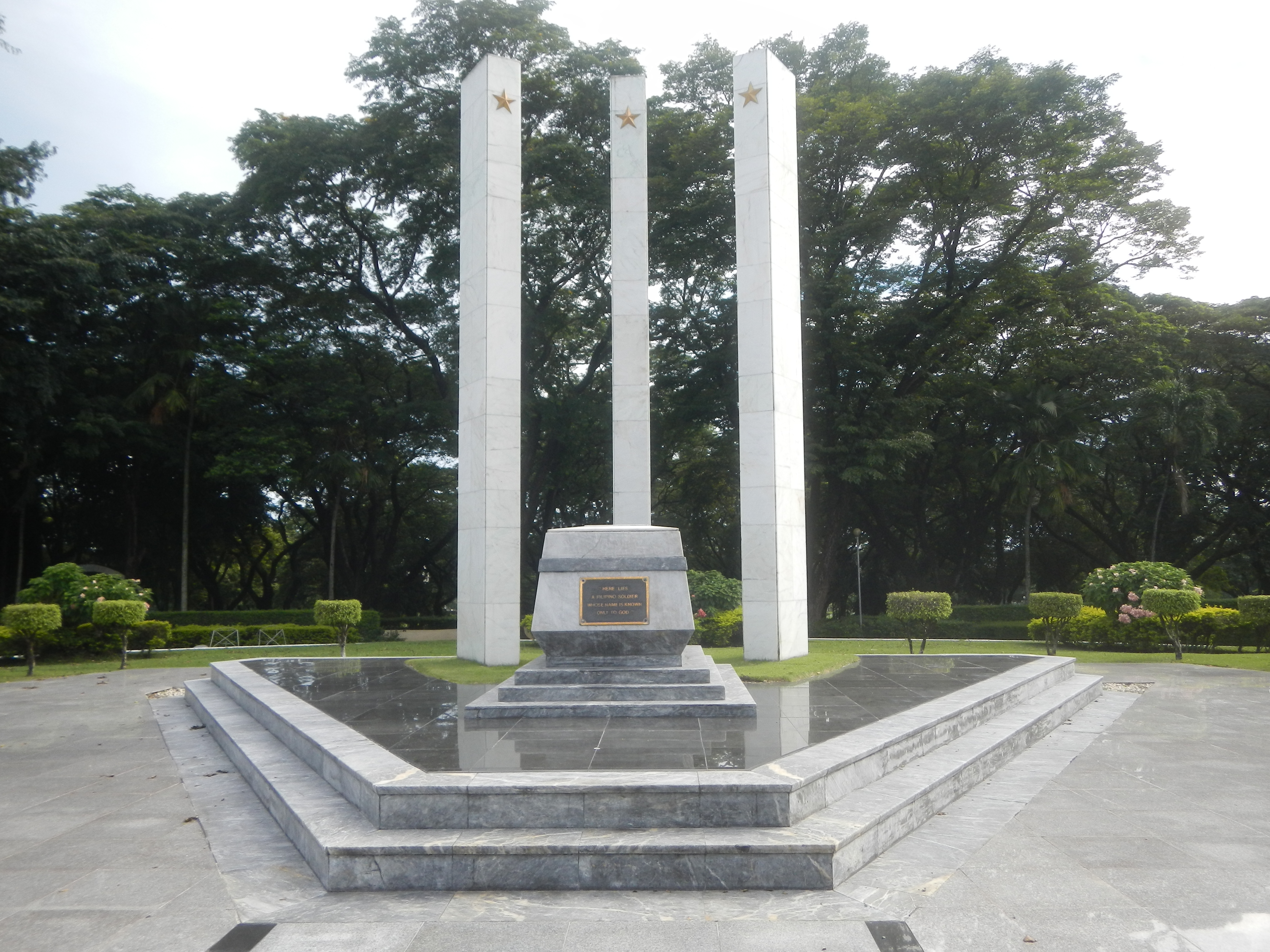
- Tomb of the Unknown Soldier at the Libingan ng mga Bayani, where officials customarily lay wreaths during National Heroes Day
- Official name: National Heroes Day
- Observed by: Philippines
- Type: Secular, heritage, governmental
- Significance: Commemorates heroes of the country
- Date: Last Monday in August
- 2024 date: August 26
- 2025 date: August 25
- 2026 date: August 31
- 2027 date: August 30
- Frequency: annual

National Heroes Day (Filipino: Pambansang Araw ng mga Bayani) is a public holiday in the Philippines celebrated annually on the last Monday of August as a tribute to Filipino Heroes.

== History ==
The holiday traces its roots to the Cry of Pugad Lawin in August 1896, which marked the beginning of the Philippine Revolution. The date and the location of the cry have been long disputed. From 1911 to 1962, the cry was thought to have emanated from Balintawak (now in modern-day Balingasa, Quezon City) on August 26. In 1963, by recommendation of historian Teodoro Agoncillo, the date was changed to August 23, and the location was changed to Pugad Lawin in Caloocan (now in modern-day Gulod, Novaliches, Quezon City). Due to the disputed date, and with the consensus that the cry occurred in late August, the holiday was then set for the last week of August.

The observance of National Heroes Day was already present during the American colonial period. Act No. 3827 by the Philippine Legislature enacted on October 28, 1931, designated every last Sunday of August as National Heroes Day. However, Bonifacio Day established by virtue of Act No. 2946 of 1921 was also dedicated to anonymous Filipino heroes. In practice, National Heroes Day celebrations were observed on the same day as Bonifacio Day. This continued during the Japanese occupation during World War II and some years after the United States granted the Philippines independence in 1946.

President Elpidio Quirino issued Administrative Order No. 190 in 1952 which reverted National Heroes Day back to the last Sunday of August. Administrative Code of 1987 of President Corazon Aquino designated the day as a regular holiday. The date of the holiday was revised again in 2007, this time to the last Monday of August, via Republic Act No. 9492 which was signed into law by President Gloria Macapagal Arroyo.

== Commemoration ==
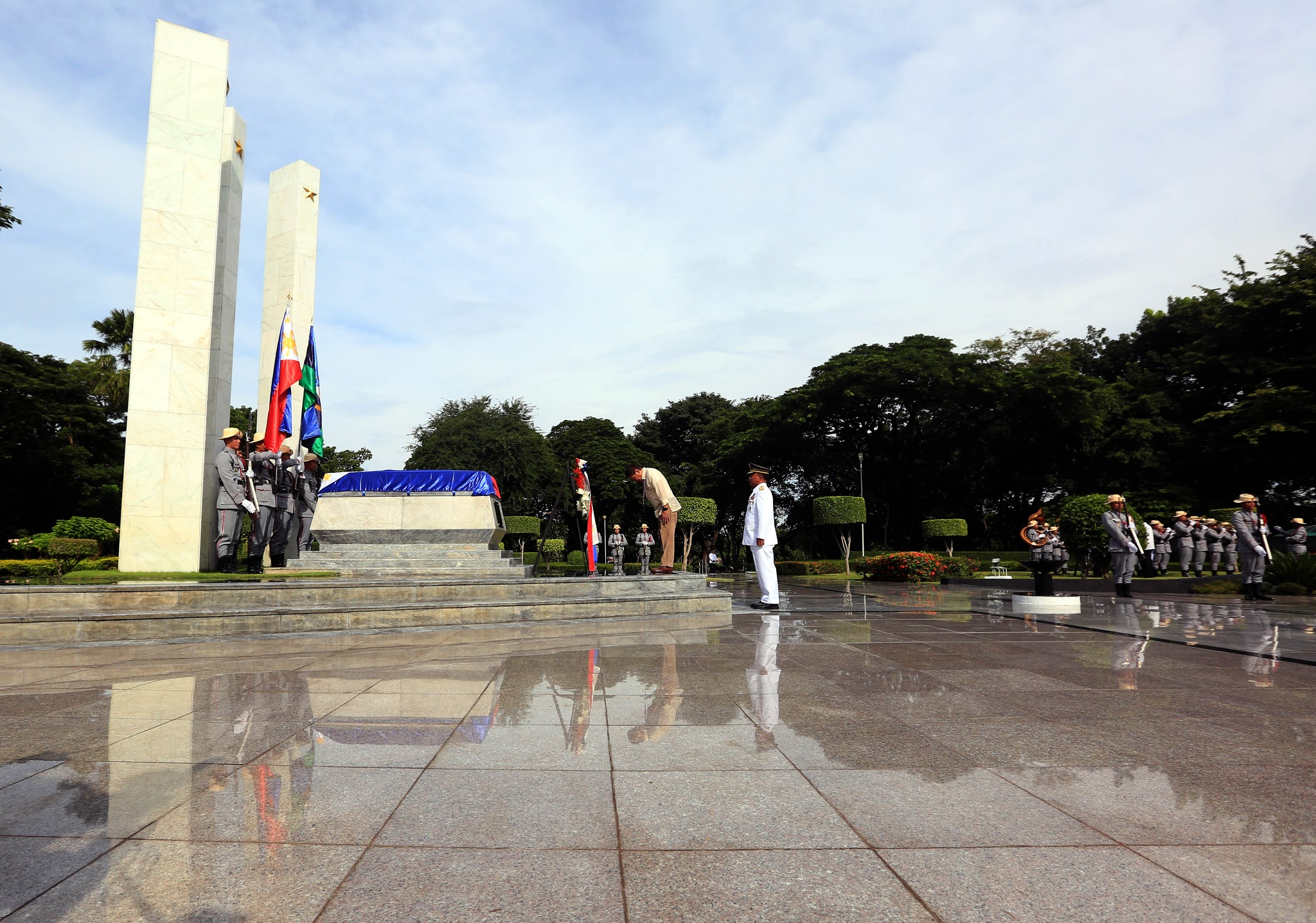
President Rodrigo Duterte laying wreath at the Tomb of the Unknown Soldier Monument on National Heroes Day 2016

The law itself does not explicitly name any specific individual to be commemorated during National Heroes Day. Commemorations often include key figures in Philippine history who are regarded as national heroes though it could also include "lesser-known" and "ordinary" Filipinos. Examples include Overseas Filipino Workers and frontline workers during the COVID-19 pandemic.
