= Our Lady of Assumption College, Santa Rosa =

Private school in Laguna, Philippines

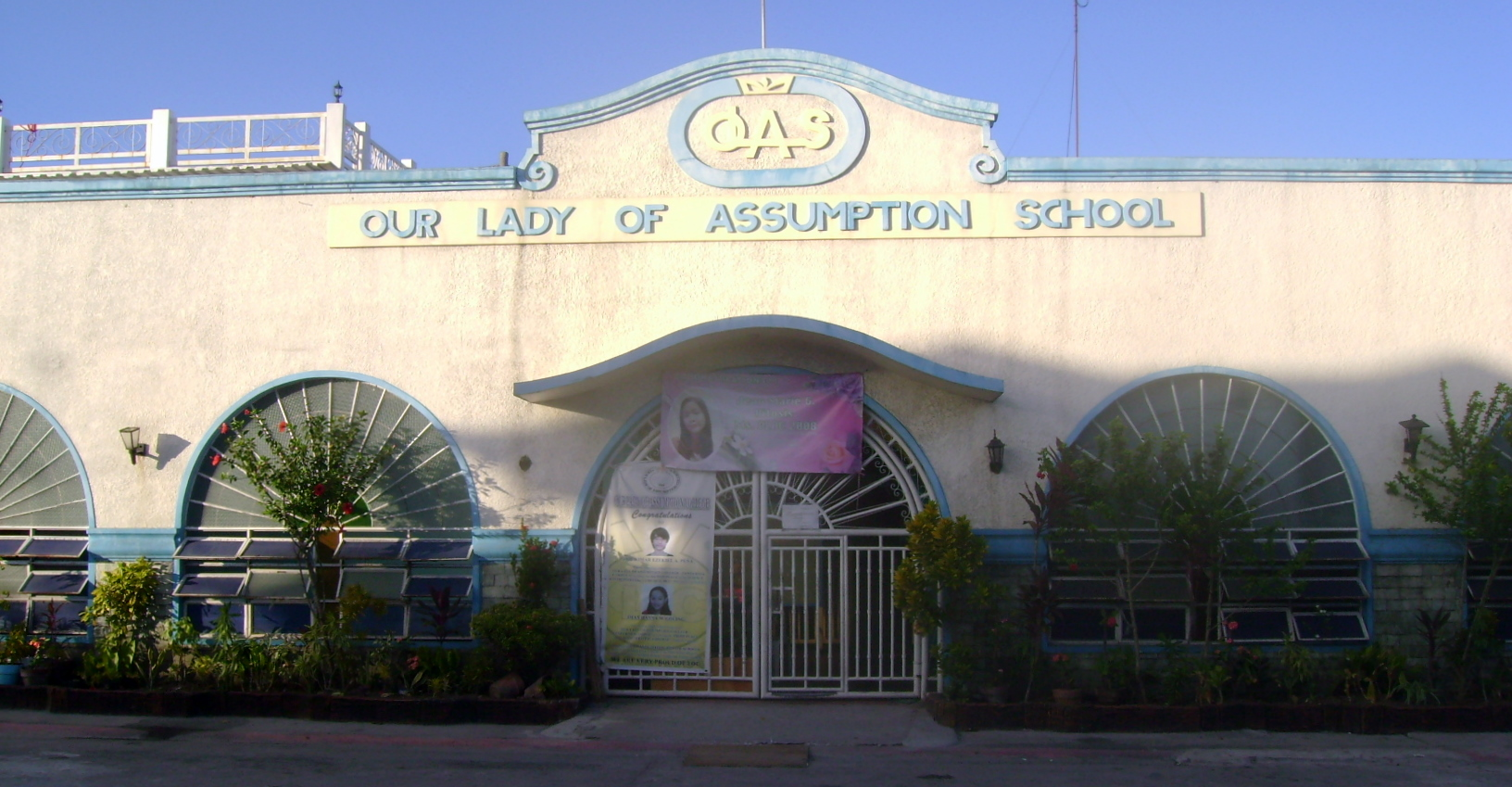
- Other name: OLAC
- Type: Private
- Established: 1989
- President: Dr. Maximo C. Acierto
- Principal: Mrs. Luzviminda R. Carullo
- Location: Santa Rosa City, Laguna, Philippines; 14°16′11″N 121°06′06″E
- School Hymn: OLAC Hymn
- Colors: Blue, Yellow
- Location in Laguna Location in Luzon Location in the Philippines

Our Lady of Assumption College (informally referred to as OLAC) is a private non-sectarian school which is located at RSBS Blvd., San Lorenzo South, Malitlit, Santa Rosa City, Laguna, Philippines. Contact No. (049) 837-83-71.

== History ==
After five years of operation at Our Lady of Assumption College - (Main Campus), its founders decided to put up another school and give way to the birth of OLAC Santa Rosa, offering a complete program from Pre-Elementary to High School.

In April 2006, the West wing of the school was demolished to give way to the construction of a new building. It was formally opened last June 2007.

== Location ==
OLAC Santa Rosa is located at Phase 1, Main Road, RSBS Blvd., San Lorenzo South, Malitlit, Santa Rosa City, Laguna.

== Courses offered ==
- K to 12

== Facilities ==
- Science Laboratory
- Computer Laboratory
- Speech Laboratory
- Audio-Visual Room
- Library
- Mini-Chapel
- Basketball Court
- Playground

== Gallery ==
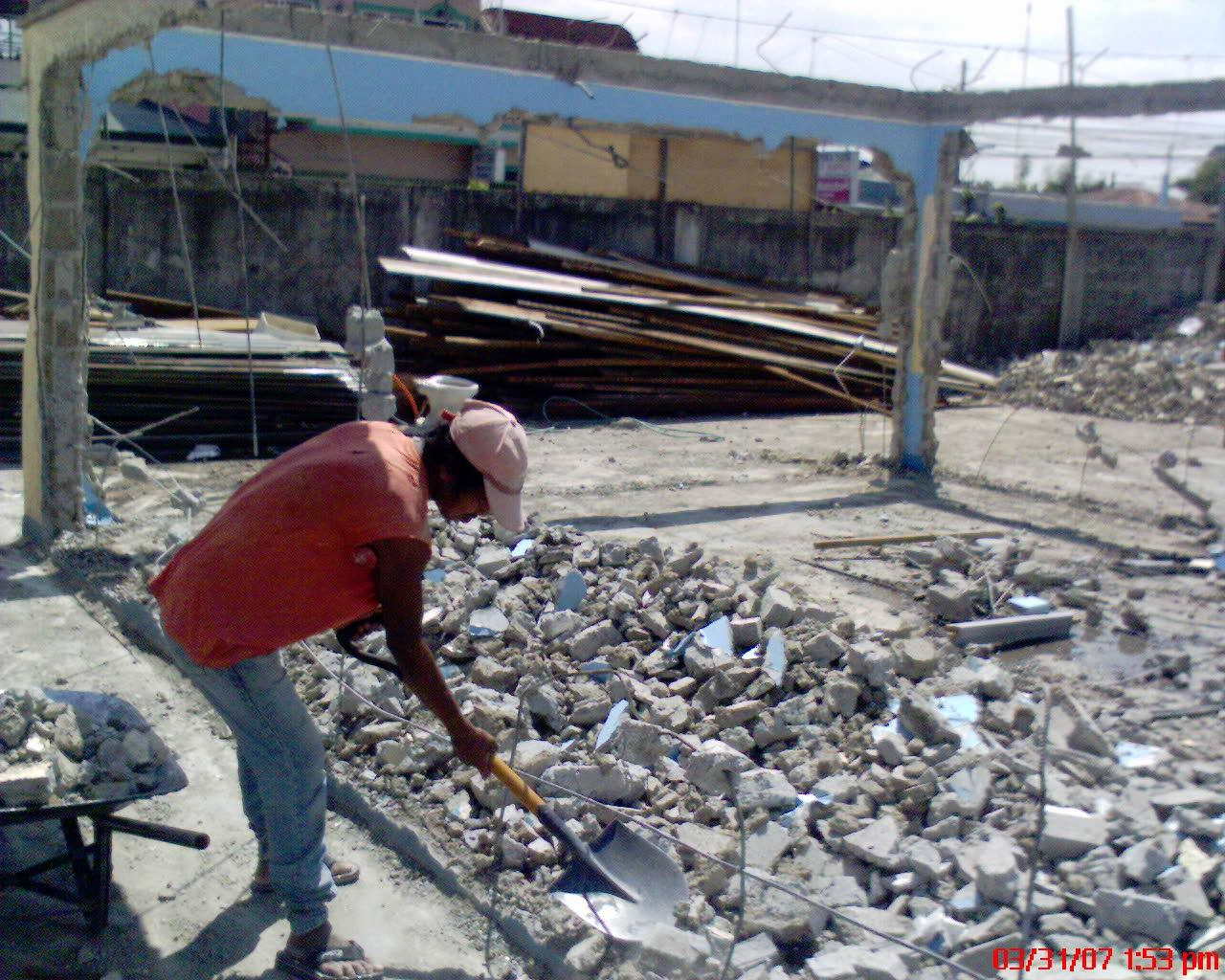
Renovation in April 2006

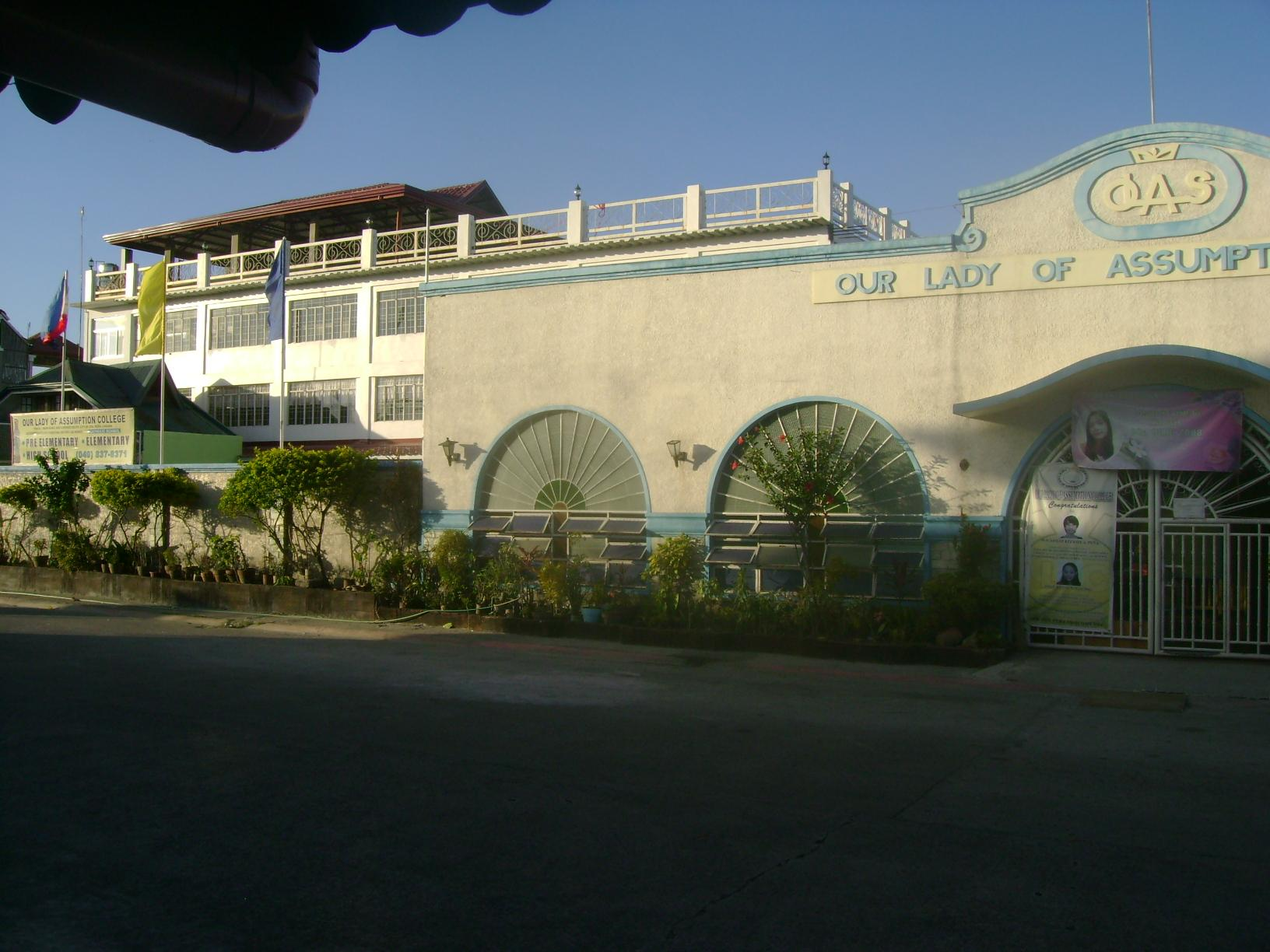
OLAC Facade

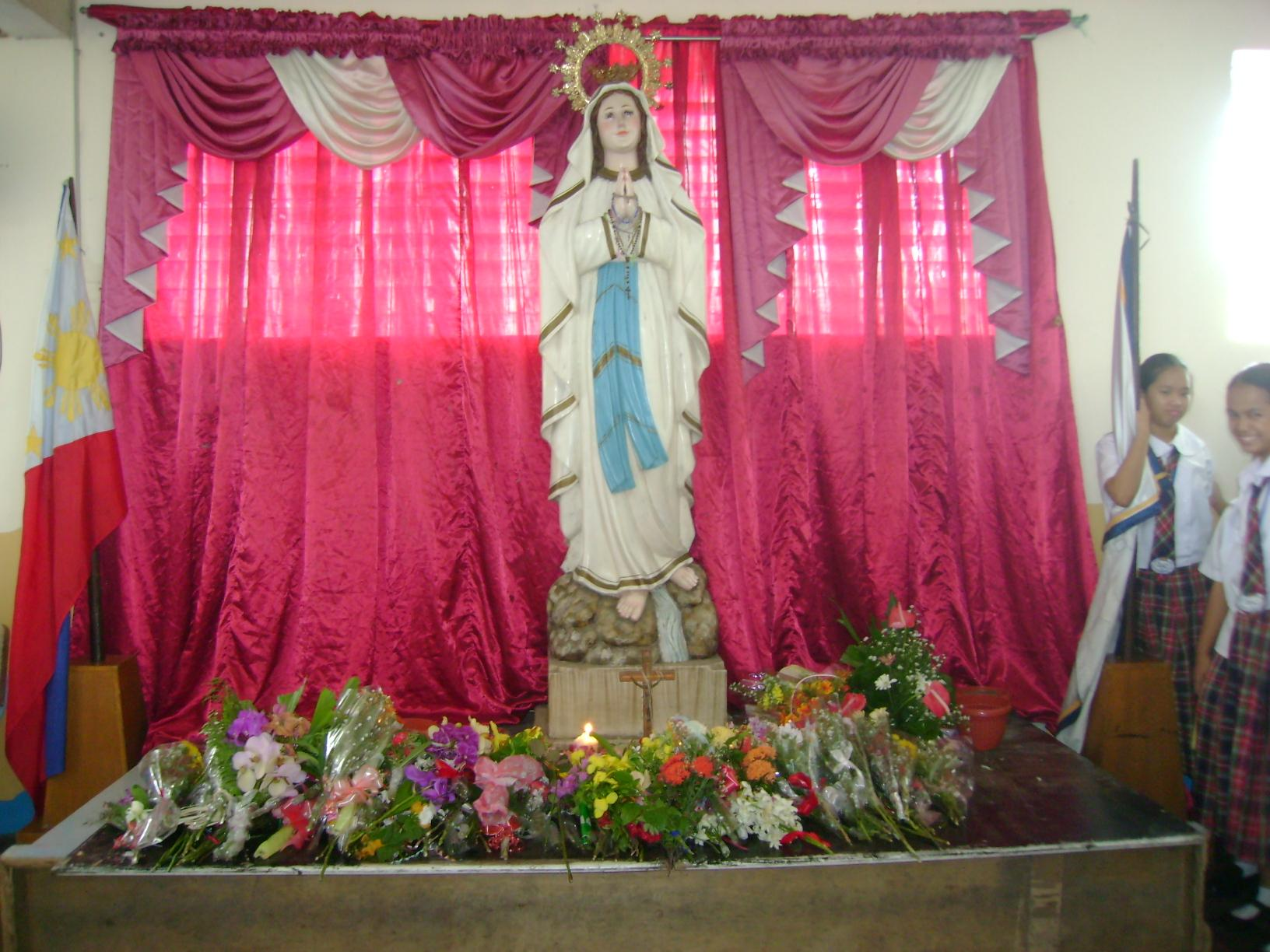
OLAC Lobby

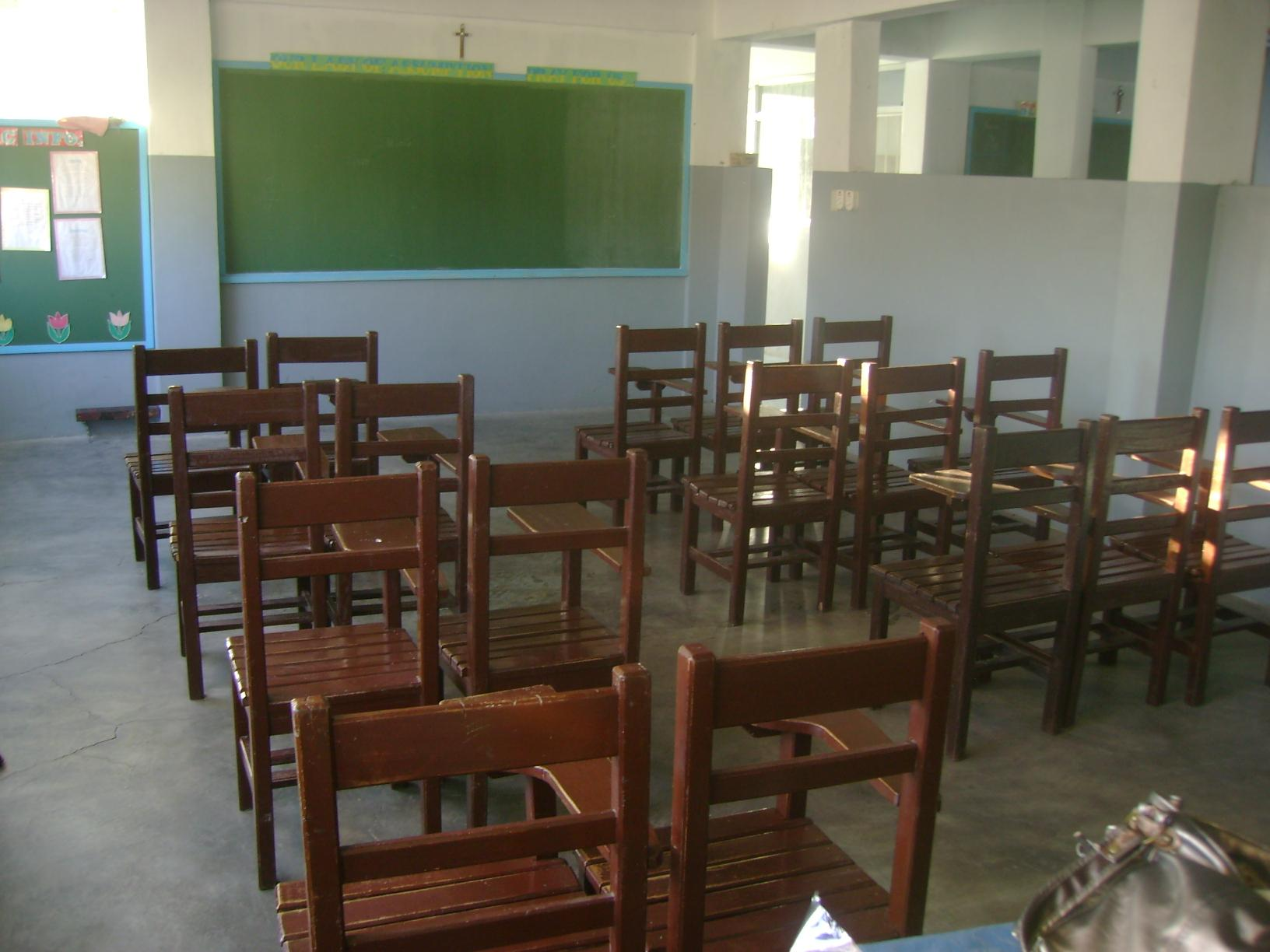
OLAC Classroom

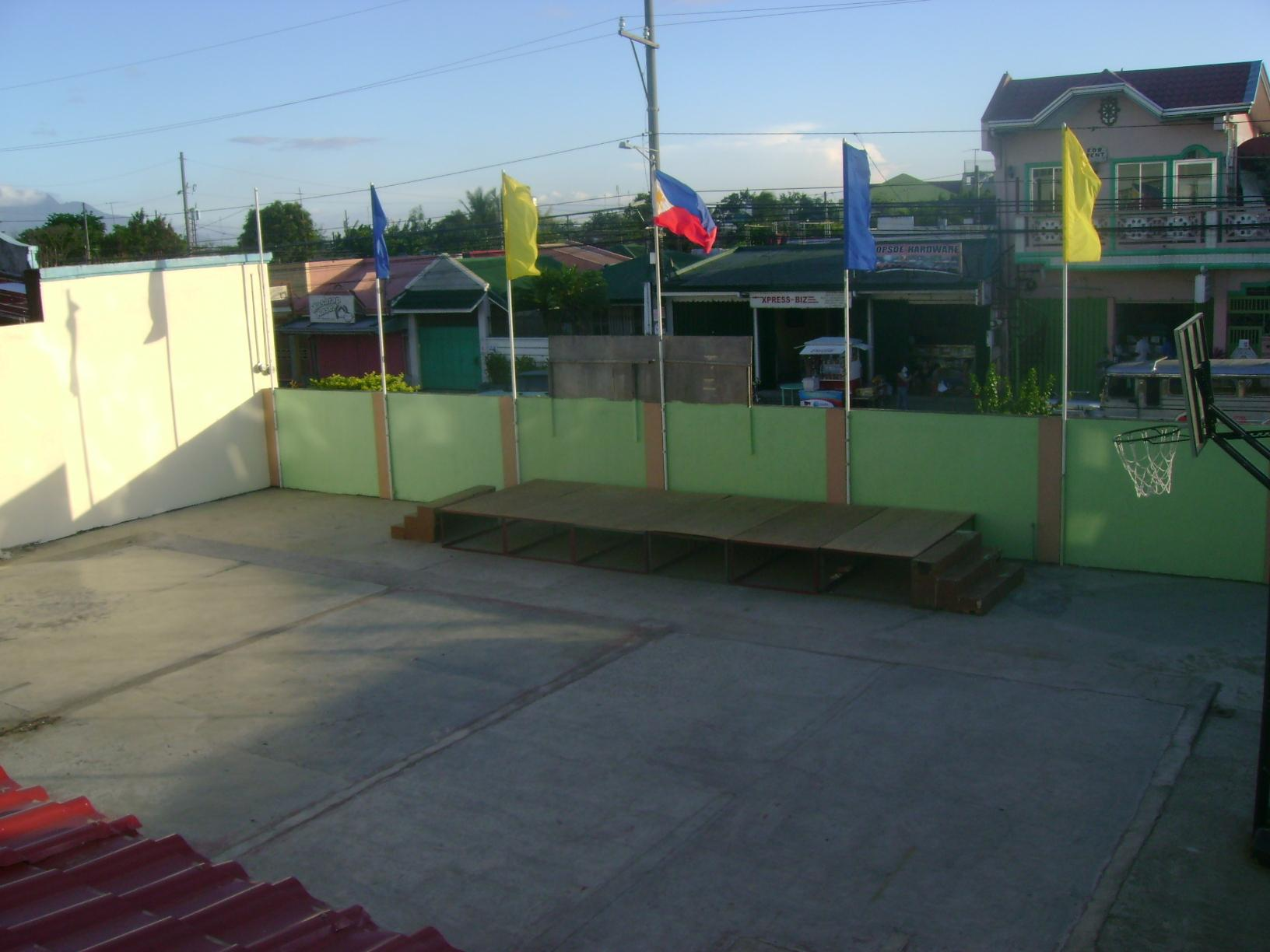
OLAC Quadrangle

== Other branches ==
- OLAC San Pedro - Main Campus (Villa Olympia Subd., San Pedro, Laguna)
- OLAC Cabuyao (Mabuhay City Phase 2 & Phase 6, Mamatid, Cabuyao, Laguna)
- OLAC Tanauan (N. Gonzales Street, Poblacion II, Tanauan, Batangas)
