= List of schools in Cabuyao =

Schools in Laguna, Philippines

Number of Schools
- Pamantasan ng Cabuyao; University of Cabuyao
Literacy Rate	98%
- Elementary [2010]: Public: 19; Private: 68
- Secondary [2010]: Public: 8 Private: 29
- Tertiary [2010]: Public: 0 Private: 8

This is a list of Schools in Cabuyao, in the province of Laguna, Philippines.

== College schools and universities ==
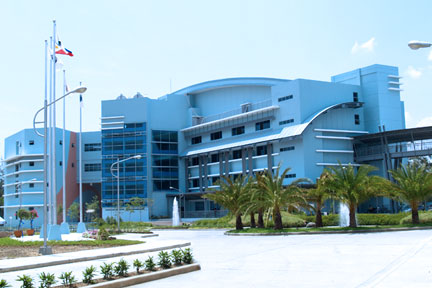
Malayan Colleges Laguna

The following are colleges and universities situated in Cabuyao:

No.	College/university	Location
1	Pamantasan ng Cabuyao (University of Cabuyao)	Banay-Banay
2	Malayan Colleges Laguna	Pulo
3	Colegio de Santo Niño de Cabuyao	Barangay Tres
4	St. Vincent College of Cabuyao	Mamatid
5	Our Lady of Assumption College-Cabuyao Campus (Main)	Mamatid
6	Our Lady of Assumption College-Cabuyao Campus (Annex)	Mamatid
7	Southeast Asia Institute of Science, Arts and Technology-Cabuyao Technological Campus	Sala
8	Asian Institute of Technology, Sciences and the Arts, Inc. ( AITSA)	Barangay Uno
9	St. Ignatius Technical Institute of Business and Arts (Cabuyao Campus)	Banay-Banay
10	CITI Global College	Barangay Dos

== National High Schools ==
List of public/national high schools in Cabuyao:

No.	Name of School	Location	Principal
1	Bigaa Integrated National High School	Bigaa	Mrs. Evelyn Lasafin Embate
2	Cabuyao Integrated National High School	Brgy. Tres	Mrs. Yolly Delloro Valiente, Principal III
3	Casile Integrated National High School	Casile	Mrs. Ma. Concepcion A. Odon, Principal III
4	Gulod National High School	Gulod	Mrs. Teodora M. Galang
5	Mamatid National High School	Mamatid	Lyell M. Fruelda, Officer-In-Charge
6	Pulo National High School	Pulo	
7	Pulo National High School - Diezmo Annex	Diezmo	Mrs. Cristina Talambayan
8	Southville National High School	Niugan	Mrs. Rowena D.G Sampaga
9	Marinig National High School	Marinig	Shyreene T. Legisma

== Private High Schools ==
The list of private high schools in Cabuyao:

No.	Name of school	Location
1	Arise & Shine Academy	Brgy. Tres
2	Agape Young Achievers School	Mamatid
3	Angels in Heaven School - HS	Brgy. Sala
4	Augustinian School of Cabuyao, Inc.	Banay-Banay
5	Bible Baptist School of Excellence and Development	Sala
6	Christ the King School of Cabuyao	Mamatid
7	Colegio de Sta. Cecilia	Mamatid
8	Colegio de Sto. Niño de Cabuyao	Brgy. Tres
9	Holy Redeemer School of Cabuyao	Mamatid
10	Hosanna Technological School of Arts and Sciences	Butong
11	Infant Jesus Montessori Center	Mamatid
12	Infant Jesus Montessori Center, Inc.	Banlic
13	Institute for Foundational Learning, Inc	San Isidro
14	Kolehiyo de Canlubang-Mamatid Branch	Mamatid
15	Jeremiah Montessori School	Butong
16	Lady of Rose Academy, Inc.	Sala
17	Liceo de Cabuyao	Brgy. Uno
18	Liceo de Mamatid	Mamatid
19	Maranatha Christian Academy	Sala
20	Our Lady of Assumption College	Mamatid
21	Regina Angelorum School	Mamatid
22	Ridpath Academy of Mabuhay, Inc.	Mamatid
23	Sacred Heart of Jesus and Mary School	Mamatid
24	St. Isidore Academy of Cabuyao	Mamatid
25	St. John's Wort Montessori School	Niugan
26	St. Joseph de Paul Academy	Marinig
27	St. Matthew Montessori and Science High School	Brgy. Uno
28	St. Vincent College of Cabuyao	Mamatid
29	Child Jesus Academy	Brgy. Sala
30	Gloridane Montessori School	Brgy. Banay-Banay
31	Our Lady of Miraculous Medal Science High School - Cabuyao	Brgy. Tres

== Elementary schools ==
Primary education and basic learning are well taught among the eighty four (84) both public and private Elementary Schools in Cabuyao, Laguna

=== Public ===
The list of public elementary schools in Cabuyao, Laguna:

No.	Name of school	Location	Principal
1	Baclaran Elementary School	Baclaran	Mrs. Esmeralda C. Delfinado
2	Banay-Banay Elementary School	Banay-Banay	Mrs. Abelinda B. Sison
3	Banlic Elementary School	Banlic	Mrs. Janet F. Haro
4	Bigaa Elementary School	Bigaa	Mrs. Magdalena S. Aragon
5	Butong Elementary School	Butong	Mr. Emmanuel B. Cerda
6	Cabuyao Central School	Brgy. Dos	Ms. Marites O. Isleta
7	Casile Elementary School	Casile	
8	Diezmo Elementary School	Diezmo	Mr. Romeo Billones
9	Guinting Elementary School	Casile	
10	Gulod Elementary School	Gulod	Mrs. Salome Manalo
11	Mamatid Elementary School	Mamatid	
12	North Marinig Elementary School	Marinig	Mr. Romeo Billones
13	Marinig South Elementary School	Marinig	Mrs. Aurene O. Aloquin
14	Niugan Elementary School	Niugan	
15	Pittland Elementary School	Pittland	Mr. Romeo Billones
16	Pulo Elementary School	Pulo	Dr. Eriberto Tangcangco
17	Sala Elementary School	Sala	Mrs. Jean E. Paz
18	San Isidro Elementary School	San Isidro	Mr. Jose Charlie S. Aloquin
19	Southville Elementary School	Marinig	Mr. Reynaldo A. Talavera

District Supervisor: Dr. Edna F. Hemedez

=== Private ===
The list of private elementary schools found in Cabuyao, Laguna:

No.	Name of School	Location
1	Arise & Shine Academy	Brgy. Tres
2	Liceo de Cabuyao	Brgy. Uno
3	Mary Immaculate Academy	Brgy. Uno
4	St. Benedict School of Cabuyao	Brgy. Uno
5	St. Matthew Montessori and Science High School	Brgy. Uno
6	Angels in Heaven School	Brgy. Dos
8	Colegio de Sto. Niño de Cabuyao	Brgy. Tres
9	Angelic Learning Center	Banay-Banay
10	Augustinian School of Cabuyao	Banay-Banay
11	Divine Mercy School of Cabuyao	Banay-Banay
12	Institute for Foundational Learning, Inc.	San Isidro
13	Jesus Covenanted Christian Academy	Banay-Banay
14	St. John Bosco Academy of Cabuyao	Banay-Banay
15	Holy Redeemer School of Cabuyao, Inc.	Banlic
16	Infant Jesus Montessori Center, Inc.	Mamatid
17	Cabuyao Nursery School and Child Center, Inc.	Bigaa
18	Build Bright Kiddie Learning Center	Butong
19	Hosanna Christian Academy	Butong
20	Jeremiah Montessori School, Inc.	Butong
21	Lazare Academy, Inc.	Butong
22	Permaja Montessori School, Inc.	Butong
23	School of Saint Joseph de Cabuyao	Butong (049)502-3924
24	School of Saint Joseph de Cabuyao(Annex)	Banay-Banay
25	Lakeside Integrated School of Cabuyao	Gulod
26	Agape Young Achievers School	Mamatid
27	Bright Computer Learning Center	Mamatid
28	The Cecilian School of Laguna	Mamatid
29	Christ the King School of Cabuyao, Inc	Mamatid
30	Heaven of Grace Academy-Laguna Campus, Inc.	Mamatid
31	Holy Angel Montessori School of Laguna	Mamatid
32	Holy Redeemer School of Cabuyao	Mamatid
33	Kiddie Star Learning Center	Mamatid
34	Kolehiyo de Canlubang Child Care and Learning Center-Mabuhay Annex	Mamatid
35	Kolehiyo de Canlubang-Mamatid Branch	Mamatid
36	Our Lady of Assumption College-Phase 2 (Main) & Phase 6 (Annex)	Mamatid
37	Precious Treasures Christian School of Cabuyao	Mamatid
38	Regina Angelorum School	Mamatid
39	Ridpath Academy of Mabuhay, Inc.	Mamatid
40	RP Mabuhay City Academy	Mamatid
41	Sacred Heart of Jesus and Mary School	Mamatid
40	St. Isidore Academy of Cabuyao	Mamatid
41	St. Jerome Integrated School of Cabuyao	Mamatid
42	St. Vincent College of Cabuyao	Mamatid
43	Sunny Ville School	Mamatid
44	Today's Kids Learning Center	Mamatid
45	Zion Academy of Cabuyao	Mamatid
46	Agape Young Achievers School	Marinig
47	Celestine Learning School	Marinig
48	Ephphatha Integrated School, Inc.	Marinig
49	Marian School of Cabuyao	Marinig
50	St. Joseph de Paul Academy, Inc.	Marinig
51	Therese of the Lake School	Marinig
52	Well of Wisdom School	Marinig
53	St. John's Wort Montessori School	Niugan
54	Centennial Learning School	Pulo
55	Gloridane Montessori School, Inc.	Pulo
56	Jesus and Mary School of Cabuyao	Pulo
57	Shepherd's Flock School of Cabuyao	Pulo
58	Acts Learning Center	Sala
59	Bible Baptist School of Excellence and Development	Sala
60	Lady of Rose Academy	Sala
62	Maranatha Christian Academy	Sala
63	Institute for Foundation for Learning, Inc	San Isidro
64	Paulinian Learning School	San Isidro
65	Krizia Ignacio Bautista National School	Sala
66	Whiz Kids Montessori School House	San Isidro
67	Gloridane Montessori School	Banay-Banay
68	Child Jesus Academy	Sala
69	St. Clare Learning School of Cabuyao	Gulod & Marinig
70	Saint Francis of Assisi School of Cabuyao	Banay-Banay
71	Academia De San Jose	Marinig
72	JACS School	Baet House
73	Nelson's Private High School	Niugan

== Special Education ==
The only special education school that can be found in Laguna is located in Cabuyao.

- The Academy of Hope (TAoH)
