= 2016 San Pedro local elections =

Philippine election

2016 San Pedro mayoral election
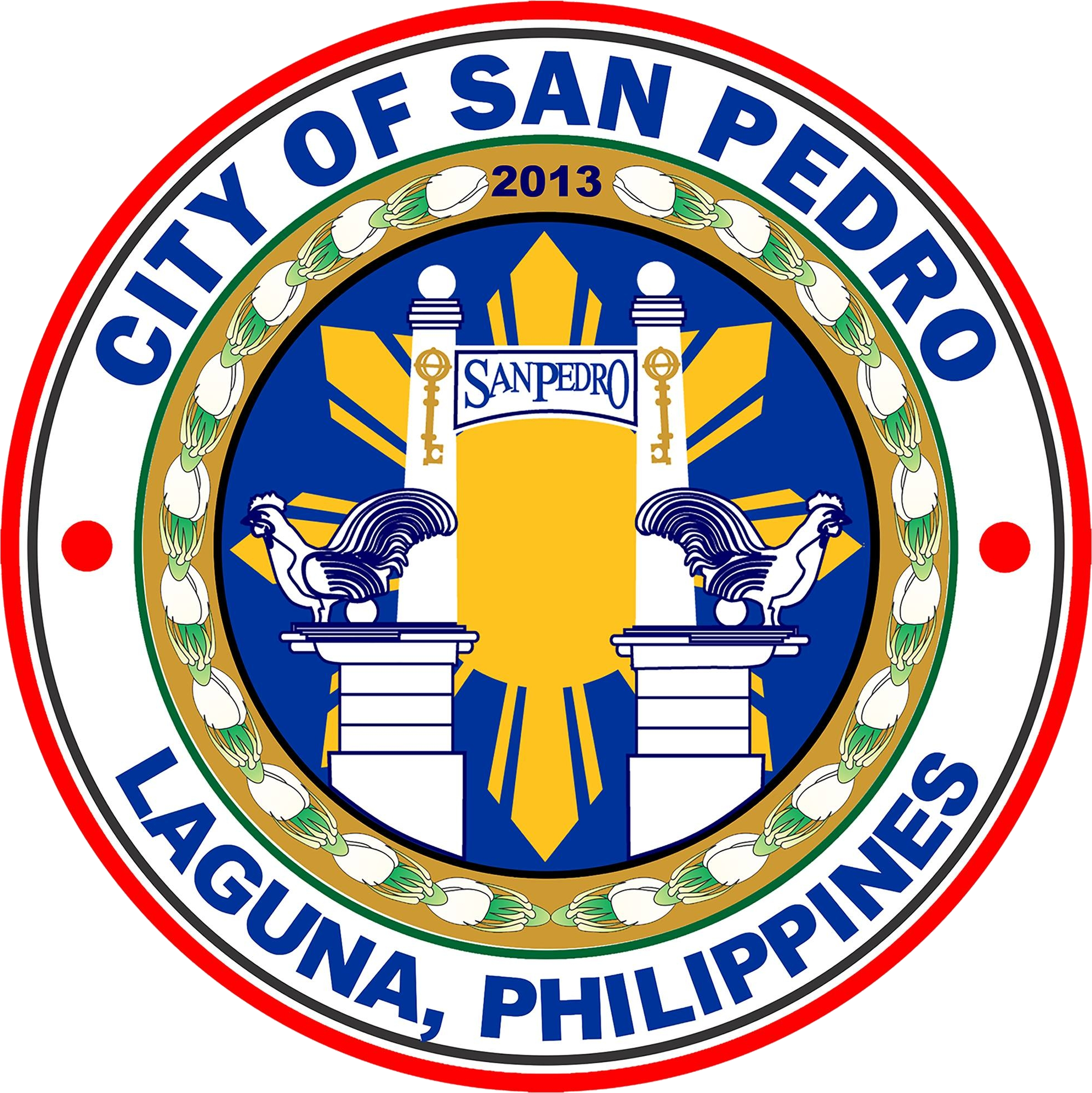
- May 9, 2016
Nominee	Lourdes S. Cataquiz	Rafael Campos
Party	Nacionalista	PDP–Laban
Running mate	Diwa T. Tayao	Iryne V. Vierneza
Popular vote	52,398	33,462
Percentage	43.70	27.90
Nominee	Eugenio Ynion, Jr.	Michael M. Casacop
Party	NPC	PRP
Running mate	Norvic D. Solidum	N/A
Popular vote	31,454	2,528
Percentage	26.20	2.10
Mayor before election
Lourdes S. Catáquiz
Nacionalista
Elected mayor
Lourdes S. Catáquiz
Nacionalista

Local elections was held in the City of San Pedro on May 9, 2016 within the Philippine general election. The voters elected for the elective local posts in the city: the mayor, vice mayor, and ten councilors.

== Background ==
Incumbent Mayor Lourdes S. Catáquiz decided to run for reelection under the coalition of Liberal Party and Nacionalista Party. Her opponents are Incumbent Vice Mayor Rafael Campos of the Partido Demokratiko Pilipino-Lakas ng Bayan, Incumbent councilor Michael M. Casacop of the People's Reform Party and Barangay Captain Eugenio Ynion, Jr. of the Nationalist People's Coalition.

Incumbent Vice Mayor Rafael Campos is running for mayor, Councilor Diwa T. Tayao is running in the position of Vice Mayor her opponent are former Vice Mayor Norvic Solidum and Councilor Iryne Vierneza.

== Results ==
=== Mayor ===
San Pedro City Mayoral election
Party	Candidate	Votes	%
Nacionalista	Lourdes S. Cataquiz	52,398	43.7%
PDP–Laban	Rafael P. Campos	33,462	27.9%
NPC	Eugenio S. Ynion, Jr.	31,454	26.2%
PRP	Michael M. Casacop	2,528	2.1%
Total votes		119,842	100%

=== Vice Mayor ===
San Pedro City Vice Mayoral election
Party	Candidate	Votes	%
PDP–Laban	Iryne V. Vierneza	41,861	36.7%
Nacionalista	Diwa T. Tayao	38,861	34.1%
NPC	Norvic D. Solidum	33,283	29.2%
Total votes		114,005	100%

=== Councilors ===
San Pedro City council election
Party	Candidate	Votes	%
PDP–Laban	Celso D. Ambayec	48,238	
NPC	Francis Joseph Mercado	46,650	
Nacionalista	Marlon A. Acierto	46,004	
Nacionalista	Delio L. Hatulan	44,982	
Nacionalista	Divina Olivarez	44,861	
Liberal	Bernadeth Olivares	44,373	
Liberal	Jamie R. Ambayec	43,212	
Liberal	Edgardo Berroya	41,633	
PDP–Laban	Carlon S. Ambayec	36,650	
Nacionalista	Kent S. Lagasca	36,088	
PDP–Laban	Medardo M. Recto	32,329	
NPC	Eliezer R. Andres	29,966	
Nacionalista	Romeo Lerit	29,206	
Liberal	Ma. Barbara Oblinada	28,111	
PDP–Laban	Reynaldo B. Hermoso	27,948	
PDP–Laban	Julian V. Ventura	27,522	
PDP–Laban	Nicanor A. Gilbuena	26,372	
NPC	Romeo R. Anaya	24,170	
PDP–Laban	Lolito R. Marquez	23,064	
PRP	Kenneth A. Berroya	22,487	
PDP–Laban	Raul C. Abulencia	22,459	
NPC	Ronaldo Amil	21,572	
NPC	Silgrid L. Villanueva	20,961	
PDP–Laban	Jaime C. Madrigalejos	20,061	
Liberal	Romeo B. Marcelo	19,505	
PDP–Laban	Fritz Brian Y. Manangbao	18,667	
NPC	Sonny Mendoza	17,697	
NPC	Sherwin Del Rosario	16,196	
NPC	Ernesto G. Martinio	14,942	
NPC	Teofilo Morando	13,767	
NPC	Roldan Concepcion	12,936	
Independent	Peps Mercado	11,270	
PRP	Shaira M. Flores	9,165	
Independent	Fernando Polillo	4,559	
Independent	Justino Racela	3,421	
Independent	Eric Roy D. Relunia	2,597	
Total votes		865,631	100.00
