= Calixto Cataquiz =

Filipino politician (1948–2022)

Mayor of San Pedro, Laguna
- In office June 30, 2007 – June 30, 2013
- In office 1986 – June 30, 1998

Chairman of the Laguna Lake Development Authority
- In office 2001–2003

Personal details
- Born: December 29, 1948 Manila, Philippines
- Died: November 30, 2022 (aged 73) San Pedro, Laguna, Philippines
- Occupation: Politician

Calixto R. Cataquiz (December 29, 1948 – November 30, 2022) was a Filipino politician who served as the former mayor of San Pedro, Laguna, Philippines. He was also a businessman and banker, and once managed the Laguna Lake Development Authority from 2001 to 2003.

== Early life and education ==
Calixto Cataquiz was born in Manila. His parents were Rodolfo C. Catáquiz of Unisan, Quezon, and Rosa T. Ramírez of San Pedro, Laguna. His parents were the pioneers of the balút industry in San Pedro. Calex, as his family members and friends call him, grew up in his mother's hometown. He was an only child from an affluent family. Cataquiz had his elementary education first in San Pedro Central Elementary School (1959–1961), then he transferred to Canossa School of Santa Rosa, Laguna (1961–1965). He spent his high school and college days in San Beda College, Manila where he took up Bachelor of Science in commerce (management).

== After graduation ==
After his studies, Cataquiz assisted his parents in their various businesses. He became the bank manager of Entrepreneur Bank (Rural Bank of Unisan) which his father had founded in the latter's hometown of Unisan, Quezon. Back in his hometown of San Pedro, he founded the Sampaguita Savings Bank at age 30, but eventually sold Sampaguita Savings Bank to a family from Muntinlupa.

== Political career ==
According to Mayor Cataquiz, he never really had any intention at all to run for any public office. He was just prodded by the people of San Pedro, particularly former Mayor José L. Amante, to run against then incumbent Mayor Felicísimo Vierneza during the January 30, 1980 Philippine Elections. He lost during his first foray into Philippine politics.

During the 1986 People Power Revolution, he led San Pedro's delegation of the Justice for Aquino, Justice for All (JAJA), funding the participants with his own money (for food, transportation, and other protest rally materials). His association with the opposition brought him into a misunderstanding with none other but his parents, who were known close friends of former President Ferdinand E. Marcos.

Due to his participation in EDSA, the leaders of the newly installed president Corazón C. Aquino's revolutionary government appointed him as the officer in charge of San Pedro, replacing Vierneza. It was not an easy ascent into power because mayor Vierneza, like most local chief executives at that time, refused to go down, believing that Aquino's revolutionary government was illegal. Thus, a forced takeover ensued wherein Cataquiz supporters clashed with Vierneza's men.

Mayor Cataquiz served as San Pedro's OIC from 1986 to 1988. During the 1988 Philippine elections, he was elected into office for the first time. He remained in power until 1998.

In 2001, he was seen once again in the second People Power Revolution at EDSA. Upon Gloria Macapagal Arroyo's installation as the 14th president of the Philippines, Cataquiz was tasked to head the Laguna Lake Development Authority.

As LLDA general manager, he was able to make Laguna de Bay a member of the Living Lakes of the World.

2007 saw him once again as San Pedro's mayor. He was re-elected as mayor in the 2010 elections. In the May 2013 election, the Commission on Elections disqualified Cataquiz's candidacy because of a prior ruling of the Supreme Court on September 14, 2011, on his disqualification for re-employment in the public service following an administrative case conviction relative to a complaint filed against him by the workers' union Concerned Employees of the LLDA.
