= Rene Alviar =

Filipino journalist (1948–2022)

Rene M. Alviar
- Born: 10 January 1948; Makati, Philippines
- Died: 27 November 2022 (aged 74); Manila, Philippines
- Education: Adamson University
- Occupation: Journalist

Renato "Rene" Mendoza Alviar (10 January 1948 – 27 November 2022) was a Filipino journalist. He covered Philippine politics and business from the mid-1970s until the early decades of the 21st century.

== Early life ==
Alviar was born in Makati on 10 January 1948 and grew up in San Pedro, Laguna where his family originated. In his 20s, he helped the government produce quarterly publications for literature and the arts under the then Minister of Public Information.

== Career ==
=== Editorial career ===
Alviar did a stint as assistant business editor for the Manila Standard. He returned to the PNA as a senior editor from 2008 to 2018. He was first a business reporter for the Manila Bulletin in 1982, covering various companies and their government regulatory agency, as well as trade, industry, agricultural, economic and development authorities. Alviar's attention to his beat enabled him to be part of the Philippine press delegation in international conferences and Organization of the Petroleum Exporting Countries (OPEC) meetings, including the ones held in Jakarta and Bali in Indonesia, Pennsylvania, California, South Carolina, New Jersey, and Orlando, Florida in the United States.

=== Notable coverage ===
Alviar argued that after the People Power Revolution, 1986 would also be the year for military officers to defend their wealth. In 2021 and 2022, Alviar's weekly columns at Tutubi.ph were written in Filipino, mostly reminding readers of the lessons learned and not learned 50 years after Ferdinand Marcos imposed Martial law in the Philippines.

Alviar was the veteran in beat reporting and became the journalist union president in Southern Tagalog. He proactively wrote articles on the killing of journalists containing sensitive yet official records using the right to information about matters of public concern and interest.

== Death ==
Alviar died on 27 November 2022, at the age of 74.
