= Laguna Northwestern College =

Private college in Laguna, Philippines

- Former name: Laguna Northwestern Institute
- Motto: Attainment of Quality in Life through Knowledge ("Karunungan para sa Masaganang Buhay sa Kinabukasan"); Investing New Knowledge for Filipino Youth.
- Type: Private, non-sectarian
- Established: May 28, 1978; 48 years ago
- President: Dr. Rolando A. Entila, MD, MBA, MPA
- Location: #56 A. Mabini St., San Antonio, San Pedro, Laguna, Philippines 4023 (Main Campus); 14°22′4″N 121°3′16″E
- Nickname: LNC Forester
- Website: lagunanorthwesterncollege.edu.ph

- Location in Laguna Location in Luzon Location in the Philippines

Laguna Northwestern College ((LNC)), formerly known as Laguna Northwestern Institute, is a non-sectarian, private college in Laguna, Philippines, founded on May 28, 1978, by the Entila family of San Pedro, Laguna. The Main Campus are in San Antonio, San Pedro City, Laguna.

== History ==
Laguna Northwestern Institute was formally inaugurated on May 28, 1978. Classes started on June 13, 1978, with 192 students on the 1st and 2nd year High School. Succeeding years opened the 3rd and 4th year High School classes, kindergarten and grades one to four classes. By 1982, LNI offered classes from Pre-school up to 4th year secondary levels. Around 1984, the institution started offering college courses. LNC formerly exist in Santa Mesa Manila.

== College Student Organization ==
The first Laguna Northwestern College-Supreme Student Council (LNC-SSC) was founded on June 29, 2012. It consists of the Presidents and vice-presidents of each course and empowered by the department representatives. The officers were elected on the same day by means of nomination, in a consensus manner. The council was officially recognized by the school president, Dr. Rolando Entila on July 2, 2012. The said council was founded by Ralph Ewoks Madronero (Secretary-General for Student Affairs and Relations) and Margarita Candy Concepcion (Head Chair for Student Affairs and Council). The first elected officers are Kevin Mchale Interno (President), Marwin Angelitud (vice-president for Internal Affairs), and Camille Cedillo (vice-president for External Affairs).

== Other campuses ==
LNC-Pacita(defunct)
located at Pacita Ave., Pacita Complex, San Pedro, Laguna 4023

LNC-Corinthian Center (established 2002)
located at Balibago St., Sta. Rosa City, Laguna 4026

LNC-San Lorenzo Ruiz Montessori Center
located at Burgos St., Siniloan, Laguna 4019

== Notable School Achievements ==
In October 2011, the Philippine Chamber of Commerce and Industry (PCCI) with its chairman Miguel Varela, announced the winners of the annual search for the 5th Best Business Idea and Development Award (BIDA), an initiative to promote entrepreneurship among the youth and announced that the Laguna Norwestern College is one of the finalist in its Service category.

LNC is a member of Commission of Higher Education-University of the Philippines, Los Baños, Laguna, Philippines, LNC also Member Of ESC funded by the government of the Philippines.
