= San Pedro, Laguna =

Component city in Calabarzon

San Pedro
- Component city
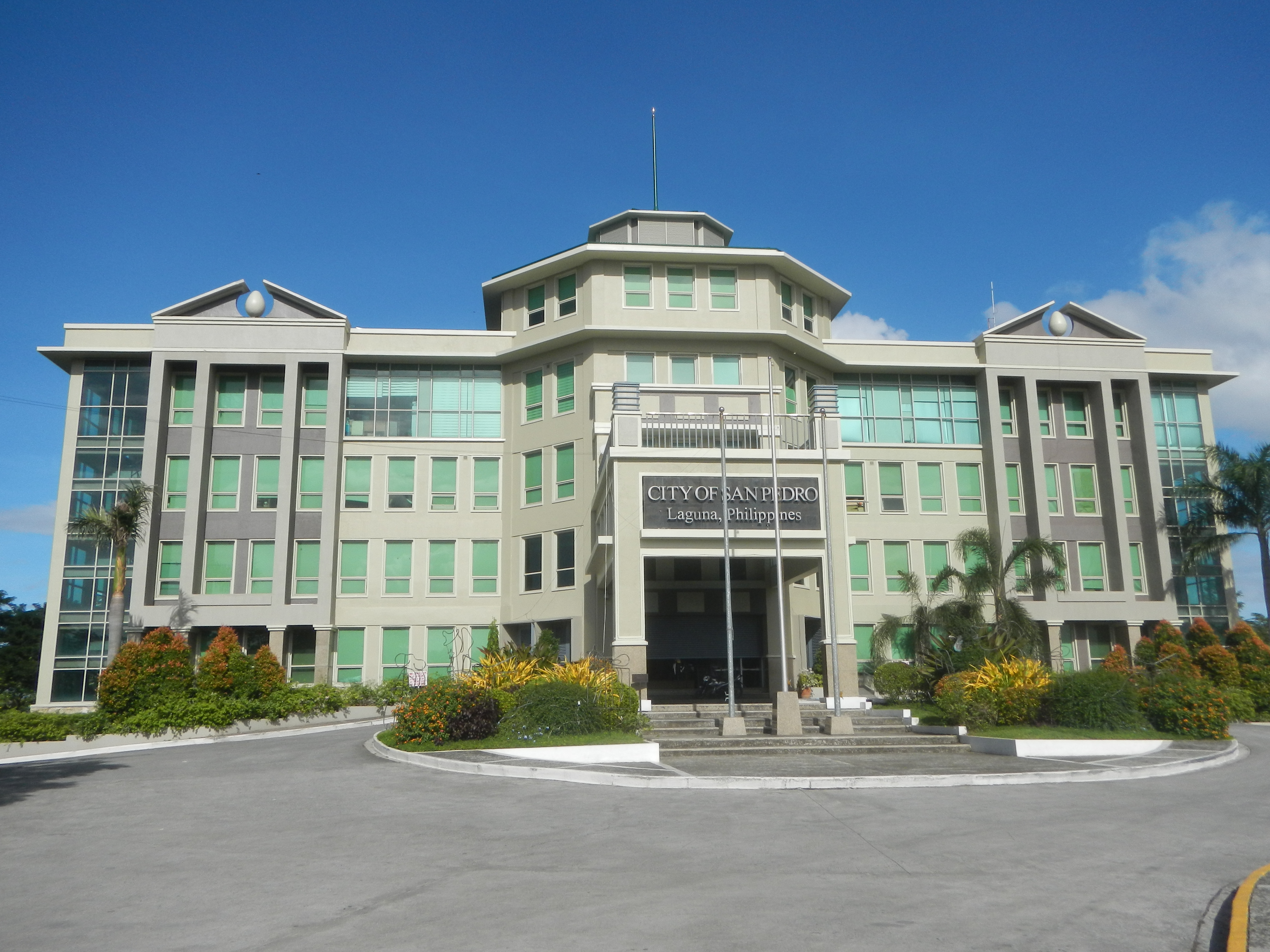
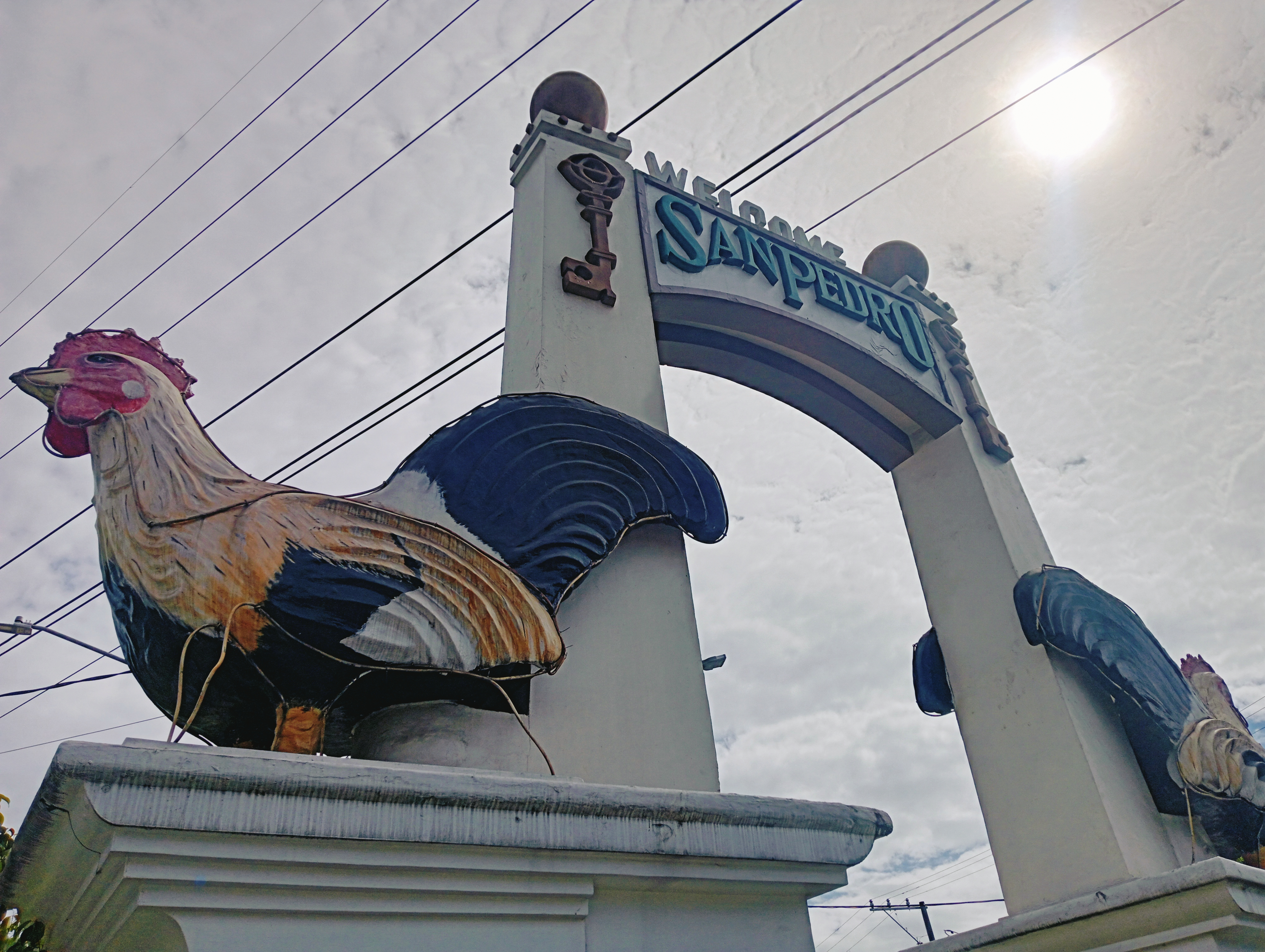
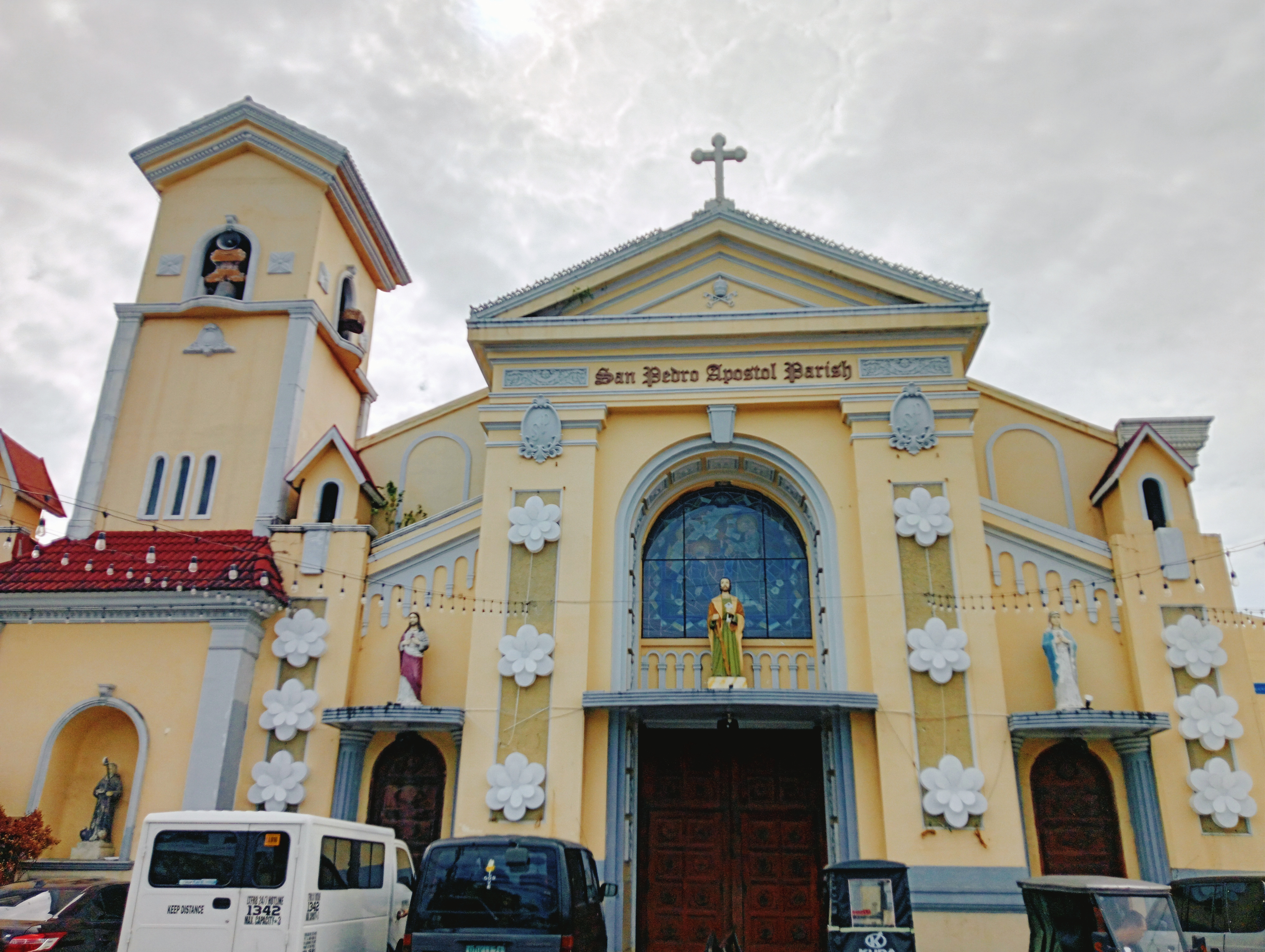
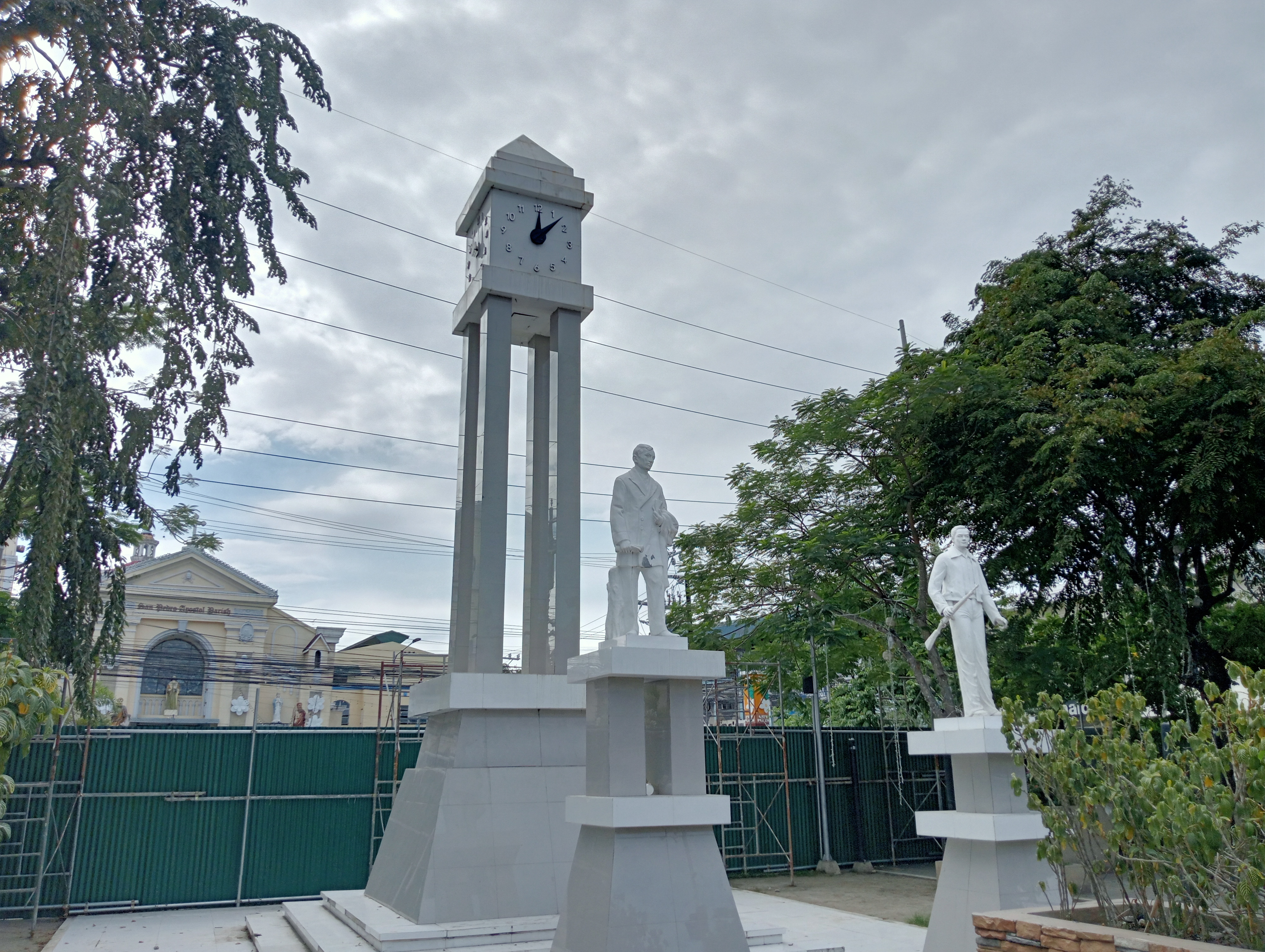
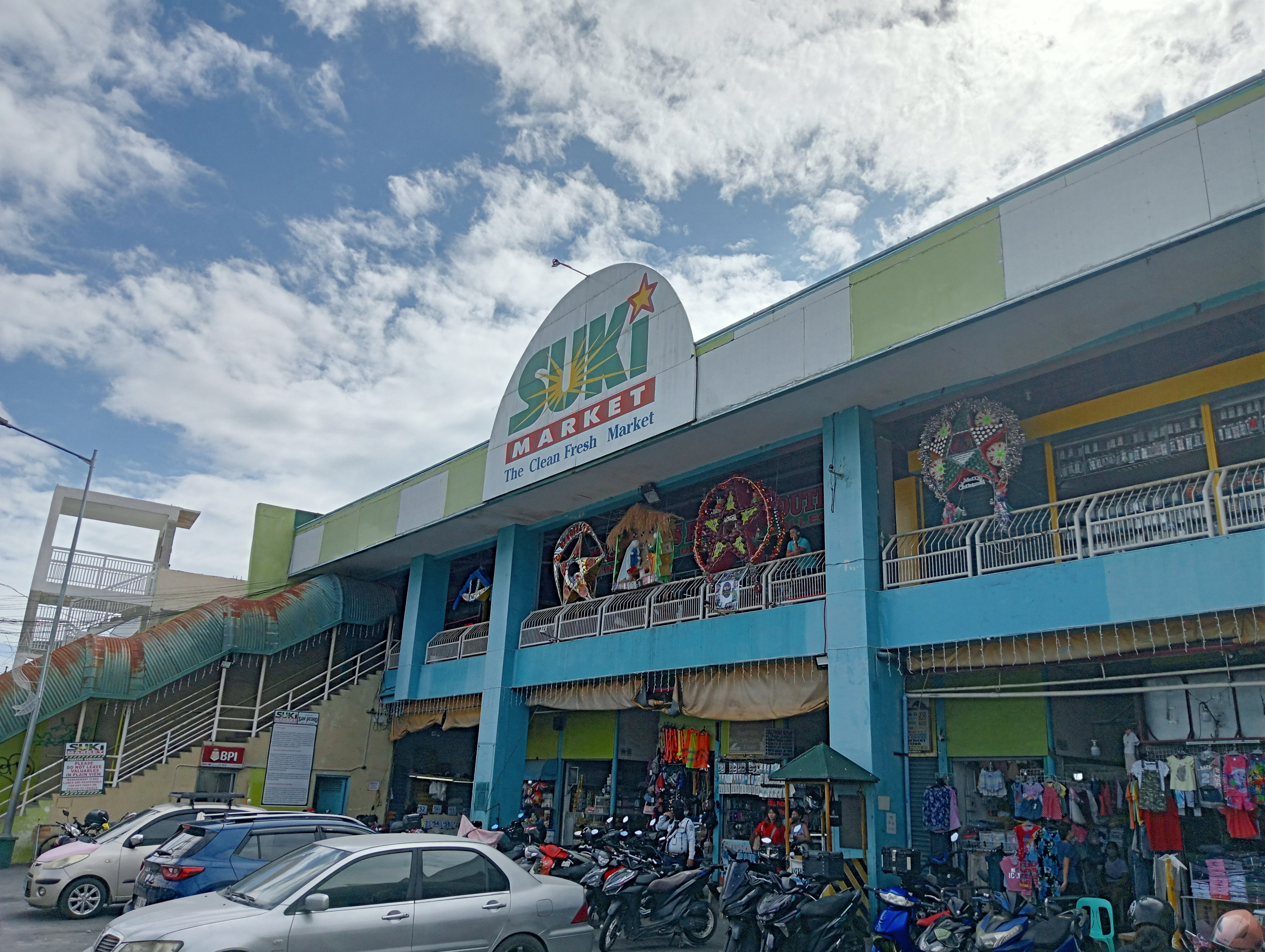
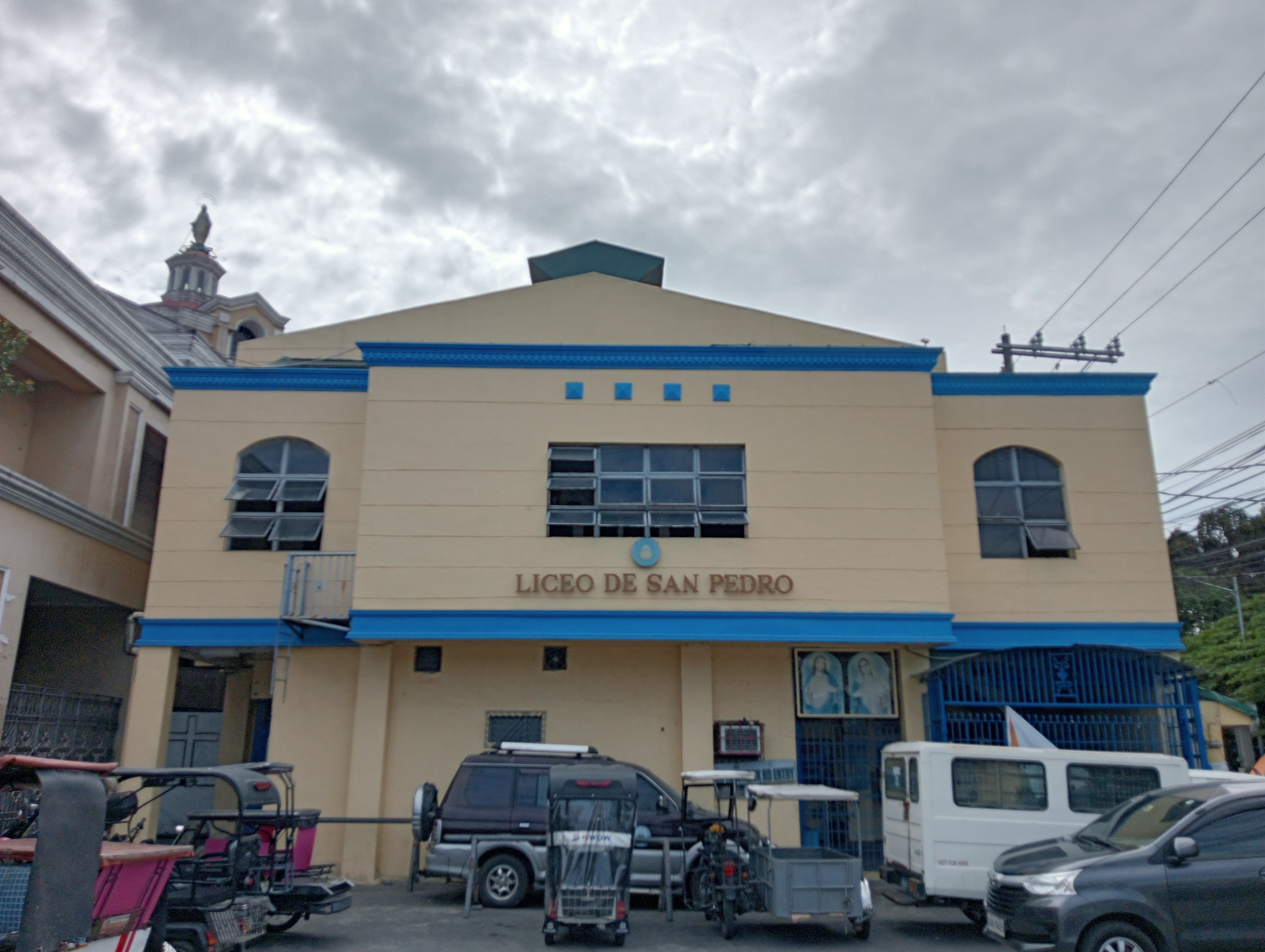
- San Pedro City Hall San Pedro City Welcome Marker San Pedro Apostol Parish San Pedro City Plaza Suki Market Liceo De San Pedro

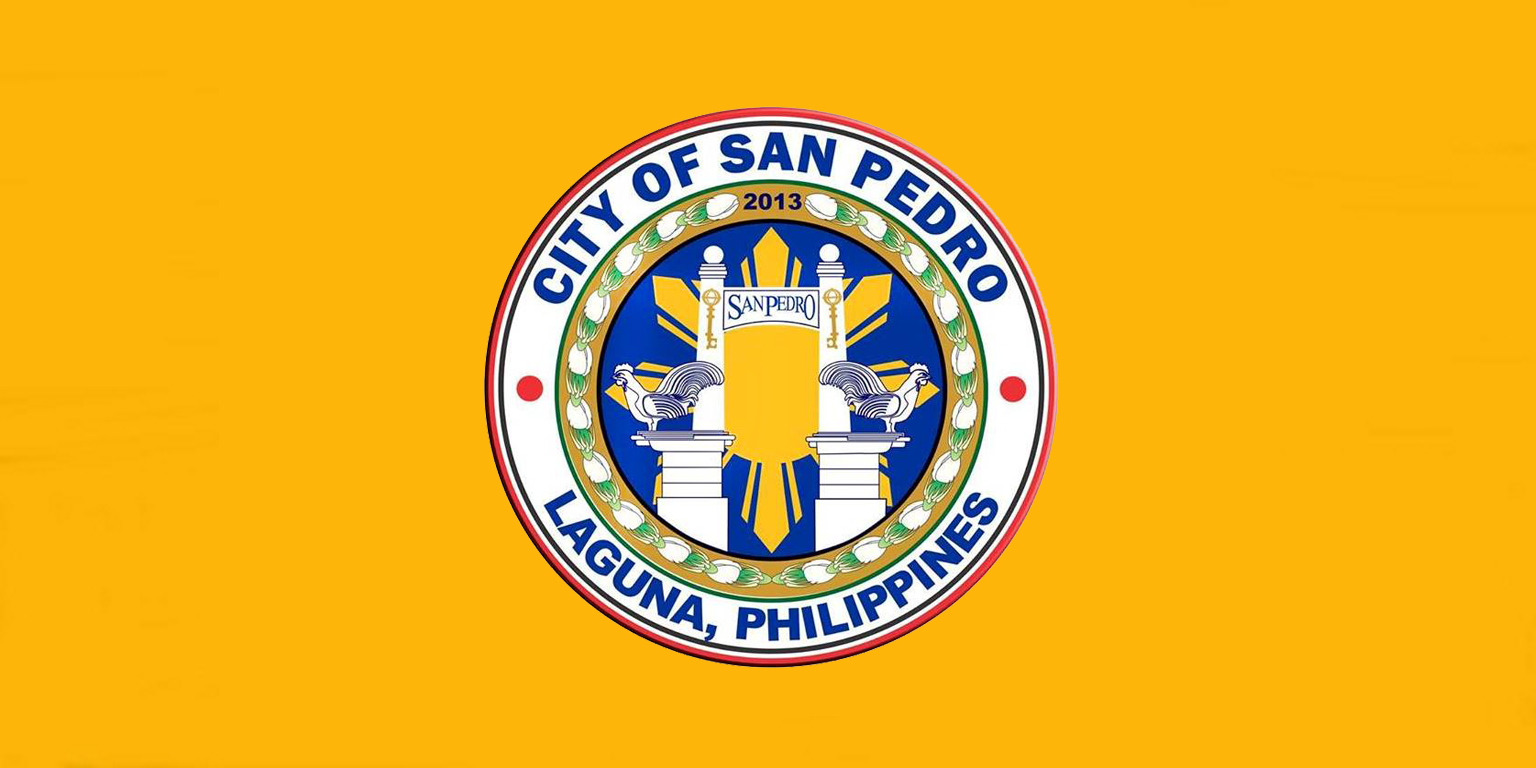
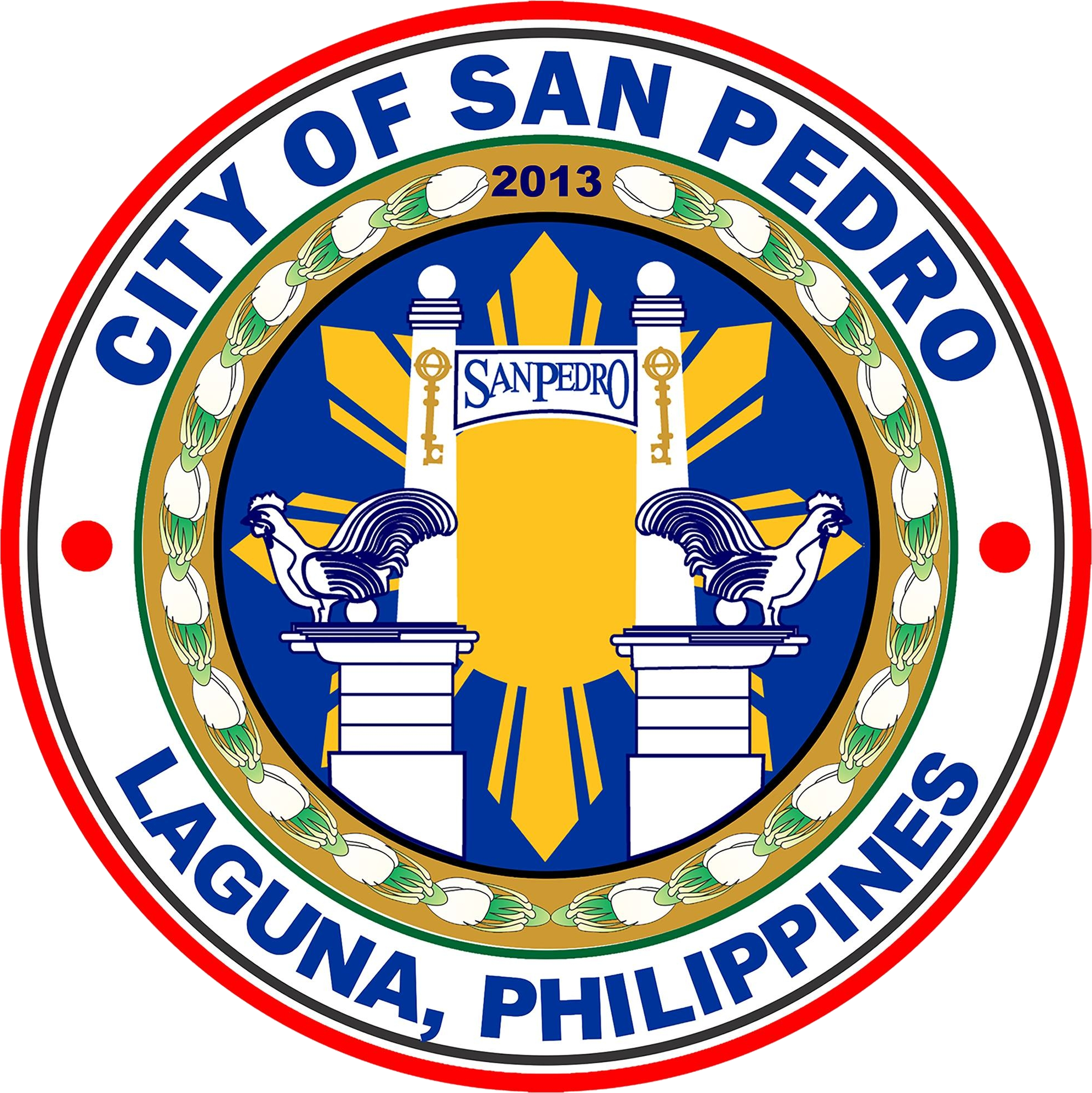
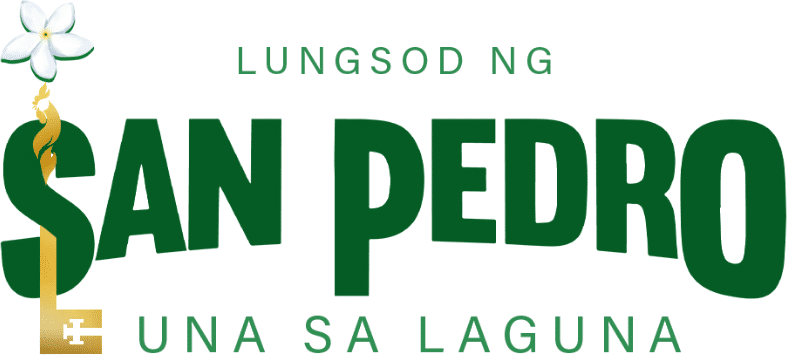
- Flag Seal Wordmark

- Map of Laguna with San Pedro highlighted
- Interactive map of San Pedro
- Location within the Philippines
- Coordinates: 14°21′30″N 121°03′30″E
- Country: Philippines
- Region: Calabarzon
- Province: Laguna
- District: 1st district
- Founded: January 18, 1725
- Annexation to Biñan: October 12, 1903
- Reestablished: January 7, 1907
- Renamed: February 28, 1914 (as San Pedro)
- Cityhood: December 28, 2013
- Named for: Saint Peter
- Barangays: 27 (see Barangays)

Government
  - Type: Sangguniang Panlungsod
  - Mayor: Art Joseph Francis Mercado
  - Vice Mayor: Sheriliz Niña B. Almoro
  - Representative: Maria Rene Ann Lourdes G. Matibag
  - City Council: Members: Michael M. Casacop; Mark S. Oliveros; Leslie E. Lu; Joie Chelsea V. Villegas; Kent S. Lagasca; Abraham S. Cataquiz; Vincent Jude T. Solidum; Maria Rosario P. Campos; Aldrin Gerrold C. Mercado; Mark Eliezer A. Acierto; Iryne V. Vierneza; Earl Gius Z. Castasus; Vioquelin B. Pascual, Jr. - ABC President; Raphael Antonio C. Ty- SK Federation President
  - Electorate: 188,803 voters (2025)

Area
  - Total: 24.05 km^{2} (9.29 sq mi)
  - Rank: 29 out of 30 (in Laguna)
- Elevation: 46 m (151 ft)
- Highest elevation: 170 m (560 ft)
- Lowest elevation: 2 m (6.6 ft)

Population (2024 census)
  - Total: 348,968
  - Rank: 4 out of 30 (in Laguna)
  - Density: 14,510/km^{2} (37,580/sq mi)
  - Households: 82,292
- Demonym(s): Spanish: San Pedrense; Filipino: San Pedronyan, Taga-San Pedro

Economy
  - Income class: 1st city income class
  - Poverty incidence: 4.57% (2023)
  - HDI: ▲0.737 – high (2018)
  - Revenue: ▲PHP 1,443,254,642.54 (2019)
  - Assets: ▲PHP 4,256,467,697.46 (2019)
  - Expenditure: ▲PHP 973,897,294.35 (2019)
  - Liabilities: ▲PHP 923,406,402.46 (2019)

Service provider Utilities
  - Electricity: Manila Electric Company (Meralco)
  - Water: • Primewater; • San Pedro Water District; • San Pedro Resettlement Area Cooperative
- Time zone: UTC+8 (PST)
- ZIP code: 4023
- PSGC: 0403425000
- IDD : area code: +63 (0)2
- Native languages: Tagalog
- Website: cityofsanpedrolaguna.gov.ph

San Pedro, officially the City of San Pedro (Filipino: Lungsod ng San Pedro), is a component city in the province of Laguna, Philippines. According to the 2024 census, it has a population of 348,968 people.

It is named after its patron, Saint Peter.

San Pedro has been dubbed as “dormitory town” of Metro Manila and migrants from other provinces commuting everyday through its highly efficient road and transport system. Despite being one of the smallest political units in the entire province, with a total land area of only 24.05 square kilometers (9.29 sq mi), San Pedro is the 5th most populous city (out of 6) after the cities of Biñan, Calamba, Santa Rosa and Cabuyao. The city also has the highest population density in the province of Laguna and in the whole Calabarzon region, having 15,000 inhabitants per square kilometer (39,000/sq mi). San Pedro became a component city of Laguna by virtue of Republic Act No. 10420 dated March 27, 2013.

== Etymology ==
The name of San Pedro originates from its old name: San Pedro [de] Tunasán. The first part of the name comes from Spanish for its patron saint, Saint Peter; while the second part comes from Tunasán, which literally means "a place where there is Tunás" (Nymphaea nouchali), a medicinal plant abundant on the shoreline of Laguna de Bay. Tunasan is also the name of a neighboring barangay in Muntinlupa, located just north of San Pedro. In 1914, by virtue of Act No. 2390, the town's name was abbreviated to its current iteration.

== History ==
=== Pre-colonial period (900–1565) ===
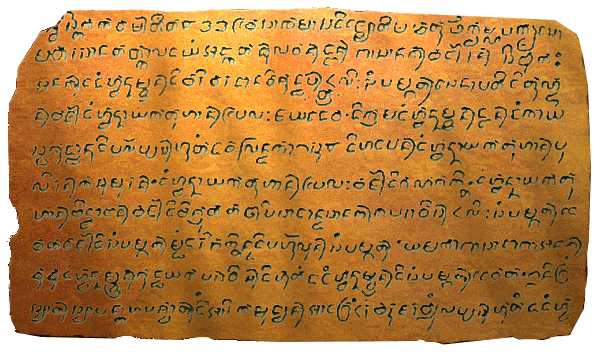
The Laguna Copperplate Inscription is the oldest historical document found in the Philippines. It has the first historical reference to Tondo and dates back to Saka 822 (c. 900).

While there is no archaeological evidence yet that indicate precolonial settlement in the present-day city of San Pedro, the area where the modern city of San Pedro is believed to be part of the native settlement of the Tagalogs centuries before Spanish contact. It is believed that the Laguna de Bay and the San Isidro River gave livelihood and food to the early settlers. As the Laguna Copperplate Inscription dated back to 900 AD was found in Lumban, Laguna, this gives an idea that the area of San Pedro may had an independent precolonial barangay headed by their own Datus and was under the influence if not directly under the alliance network of the Lakan of Tondo.

=== Spanish colonial period (1565–1896) ===
On July 28, 1571, a month after the Spanish conquest of Manila, Miguel Lopez de Legazpi distributed certain parts of Luzon to the members of his expedition who assisted them in securing the Philippines for the King of Spain. Among those given were settlements near Laguna de Bay, with Gaspar Ramirez received 16 villages, with 14 of which located near the river of Calamba, while Francisco de Herrera received four other villages near the lake. Martin Gutierrez and Alonzo Ligero received five villages each, Pedro de Herrera received six villages, including the Indios of the Siniloan River, and Lope Garcia de Herrera received four villages. It is estimated that among these communities was the township of Tabuco, which comprises the modern-day cities of San Pedro, Biñan, Santa Rosa, and Cabuyao. By 1591, it was written that the encomienda of Tabuco belonged to Don Luis Enriquez, with four thousand persons.

One member of Legazpi's expedition, the Portuguese-born Esteban Rodriguez de Figueroa, also received vast land grants from the King of Spain in recognition of his efforts to conquer the Philippines for Spain. Recognizing that he may die on his upcoming military expedition in Mindanao, he wrote down his last will in Arevalo, Iloilo, where he donated the funds that established the Jesuit-run Colegio de Manila, and naming his wife and daughter as heirs. He likewise wrote that if they die without direct heirs, the Jesuits would use their inheritance for a college. Rodriguez died in 1595, and after almost a decade, in 1604, his daughter perished when the galleon San Antonio sank en route to Mexico. Upon their demise, the endowment of Rodriguez was subsequently applied to Colegio de San Jose (now San Jose Seminary), established three years earlier, in 1601.

Around 1629, the Colegio de San Jose acquired from the Colegio de Manila parcels of land on the southwestern shore of the Laguna de Bay, near present-day Biñan. Years later, in 1634, they also purchased parcels of land within the area owned by the widow of Sergeant Pedro Dominguez Franco. They merged these acquisitions to form the Hacienda San Pedro de Tunasan. However, in November 1639, the Chinese who were working against their will in the neighboring Calamba estate revolted, with the sugarcane fields of the Hacienda Tunasan destroyed in the process. In 1698, Tabuco, together with Biñan and San Pedro Tunasan, underwent pastoral visitation by Manila Archbishop Diego Camacho y Ávila. In the said inspection, Camacho observed that the parishones are not knowledgeable of the Christian faith, prompting him and his assistant Fr. Juan Melendrez to meet the residents individually and test them on their knowledge on the basic Christian (i.e. Catholic) doctrines. Afterwards, he commanded the priests-in-charge of the area, Rev. Frs. Manuel de Leon (Tabuco), Nicolas Godiño (Biñan), and Jesuit Miguel de Salas (San Pedro Tunasan) to instruct their people on the fundamental Christian doctrines. Camacho likewise ordered that the priests and their successors should not to oblige their parishioners to offer anything for the administration of the sacrament of penance, with major excommunication as penalty for non-compliance.

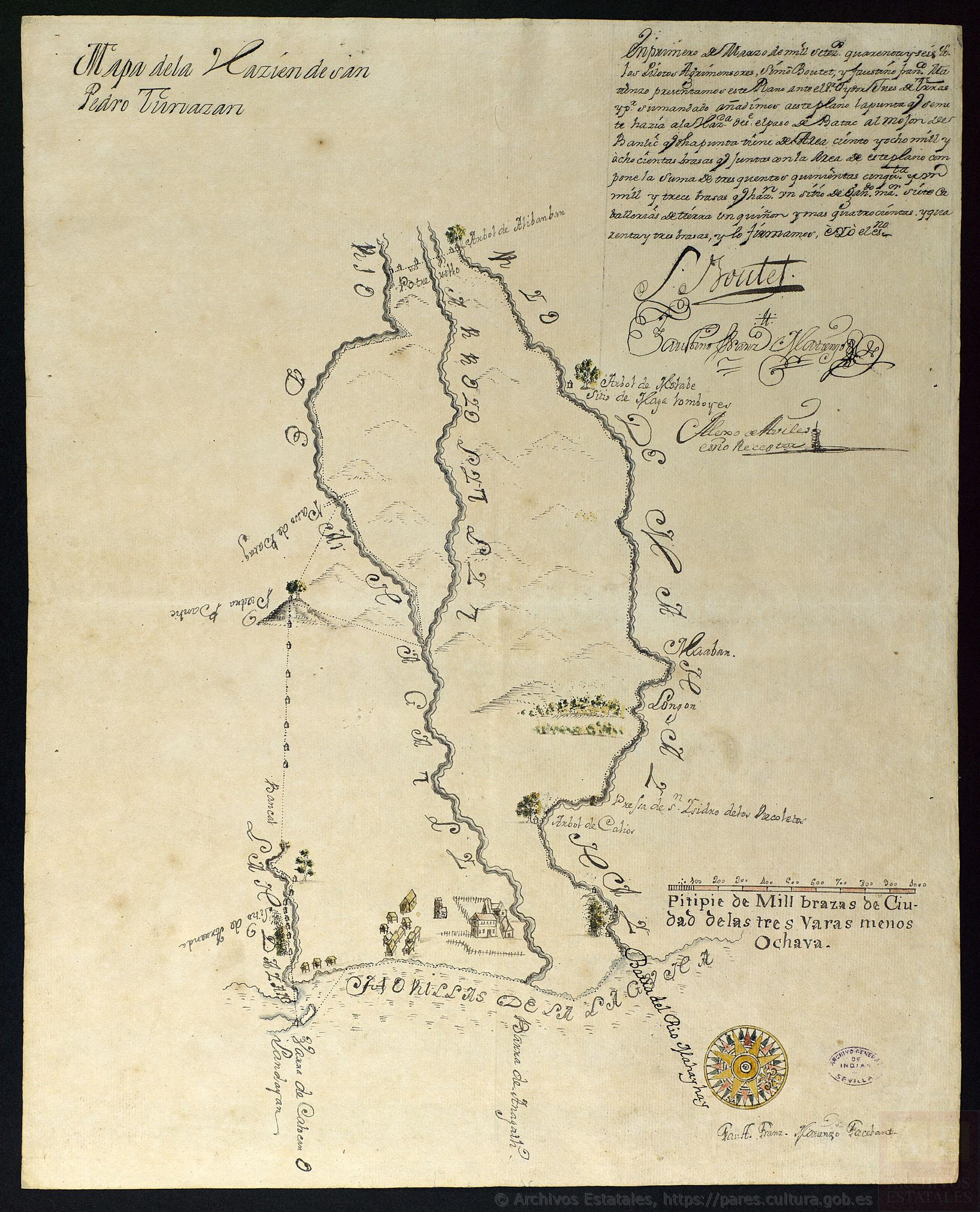
Map of Hacienda San Pedro Tunasan, La Laguna, ca. 1745. From the Archivo General de Indias.

It is claimed that San Pedro de Tunasán became a town on January 18, 1725, upon the request of a group of San Pedrense Principalía led by Alonzo Magtibay, Francisco Santiago, and Ignacio de Guevarra and subsequently approved by the Governor-General and Manila Archbishop Francisco de la Cuesta. King Philip V of Spain was said to have decreed that the town be separated from Tabuco. Francisco Santiago subsequently became the first mayor of the newly formed town. However, another author, Agustin de la Cavada wrote that San Pedro Tunasan became a town in 1712.

Agriculture, especially livestock raising, farming, and fishing, during that period, was its residents' primary income source. Manuel Buzeta and Felipe Bravo described the town in 1851 as having 613 houses, with a town hall and jail, and a primary school that caters to the young learners. Its parish was constructed using mixed materials and managed by a native secular priest. The crops that are said to be grown by the residents at this time were rice, sugar cane, corn, coconuts, mangoes, and other fruits and vegetables. The Rector of the Colegio de San Jose, in support of the Sociedad Economica de los Amigos del Pais, introduced mulberry planting in Hacienda San Pedro Tunasan to compete with the Chinese silk-making industry. Initially successful, the farmers eventually abandoned it, with the Spaniards blaming what they perceived as laziness of the Filipinos. Despite this, San Pedro Tunasan was among the towns that frequently experienced banditry and cattle-rustling, leading to the reputation that the town itself is not safe.

The 1818 Spanish census recorded the area as having 1,112 native families and 2 Spanish-Filipino families.

=== The revolutionary struggle (1896–1898) ===
During the early months of the revolution, siblings Antonino and Jose Guevara led the residents of San Pedro Tunasan in joining the nationalist cause. Due to its proximity to Cavite and to the Manila area, the local residents were advised by General Emilio Aguinaldo to discreetly sympathize with the revolutionaries as to not compromise the role of San Pedro as a rearguard of the revolutionary struggle. San Pedrenses followed this advise and secretly provided food and provisions to the Revolutionaries in Cavite. When the Spaniards launched their counteroffensive in Cavite, the people of San Pedro sheltered refugees from Cavite, including General Mariano Alvarez, and Andres Bonifacio's widow Gregoria de Jesus.

San Pedro eventually became under the command of Katipunero General Paciano Rizal, brother of Jose. With the help of Guevara, they finally organized a municipal government led by mayor Gregorio Alvarez, who welcomed de Jesus and others to the town in 1897. De Jesus lived in the residence of Almario Ilmedo in San Roque village during her stay. Upon the resumption of the Philippine Revolution in May 1898, San Pedro was among the towns liberated by Filipino revolutionary forces on the offensive in Laguna. Some San Pedrense revolutionaries even helped in the liberation of other towns in the province from Spanish control.

=== First Republic and the Philippine-American War (1898–1901) ===
San Pedro was among the towns controlled by Filipino forces when the Philippine Declaration of Independence was promulgated on June 12, 1898. As a result, its presidente municipal, Gregorio Alvarez was among those who participated in the Bacoor Assembly of August 1, 1898. In this meeting held at Bacoor's Cuenca Mansion, about 200 municipal presidents ratified the Philippine Declaration of Independence. Months later, on December 30, 1898, San Pedro was among the towns who commemorated the first Rizal Day in accordance with the decree issued by President Aguinaldo. The parish priest of the San Pedro Apostol Parish, Fr. Victor Enrile, presided a Requiem Mass in honor of Dr. Jose Rizal inside the church, which was followed by a program where patriotic residents praised Rizal and rebuked the Americans due to the signing of the Treaty of Paris (1898).

When the Philippine-American War broke out, San Pedro Tunasan initially served as one of the rearguards for the forces of the First Philippine Republic. Some residents even formed a militia that joined the fight against the Americans. However, on January 6, 1900, during their military expedition of Brigadier General Theodore Schwan, the Americans entered San Pedro Tunasan without any resistance. Some residents who were suspected of sympathizing with the First Philippine Republic were arrested by the Americans and severely tortured. When President Aguinaldo ordered the Filipino forces to shift to guerrilla warfare, the politico-military governor of Laguna, General Juan Cailles placed San Pedro, together with Biñan, Santa Rosa, Cabuyao, and Calamba under the leadership of Colonel Severino Taiño. When Taiño was killed somewhere between San Pedro and Biñan, he was replaced by Colonel Julio Infante.

After the surrender of the First Republic in March 1901, General Miguel Malvar made San Pedro Tunasan part of his guerrilla area of operations, prompting the Americans to subject the town to hamletting tactics to force the remaining Filipino guerrillas to surrender. Later, Filipino resistance forces led by General Macario Sakay operated in San Pedro until his execution in 1907.

=== American colonial period (1898–1946) ===
Once the Americans seized control of San Pedro on January 6, 1900, they appointed Benito Almendrala as Municipal President, and Arcadio Morando as Chief of Police. A year later, Toribio Almeida became the first elected Municipal President of San Pedro. As an austerity measure of the American Colonial Government, in 1903, by virtue of Act No. 939, San Pedro Tunasan's township status was dissolved becoming part of the then town of Biñan. In the same year, Muntinlupa was joined to the aforementioned under Act No. 1008. The local residents requested the Insular Government to reinstate San Pedro as a town, which succeeded upon the enactment of Act No. 1553 in 1906. Pascual Mindo became the municipal president of the revived Municipality of San Pedro Tunasan in 1907. It was also around this time that the Hacienda San Pedro de Tunasan was reverted to Jesuit control, following the orders of the Holy See that the Colegio de San Jose, together with the Hacienda Tunasan be returned by the Dominican friars to the Jesuit fathers. Eventually, an American businessman, Carlos Young, leased the Hacienda from the Jesuits.

Despite the town's development under the Americans, San Pedro also experienced conflicts and upheavals during the American Period. This period saw the tense agrarian conflict between the local residents and the administration of the Hacienda San Pedro Tunasan. Young, as the lessor of the Hacienda, was alleged to impose rent hikes to the point that the tenants were not able to pay it. This resulted to the expulsion of some tenants and demolition of their houses in the hacienda property. The residents, asserting their right to the Hacienda lands that they cultivate, organized various agrarian movements in San Pedro, such as the Katipunang Laban sa Hacienda (KALASAHA), the JAMAT, and Samahang Oras Na. The conflict swung to a violent turn when in 1935, a demolition attempt by the Hacienda administration in Barangay Cuyab resulted in a riot that resulted to the death of a young resident, Generoso "Ka Osong" Garcia. This prompted the Philippine Constabulary to deploy troops in San Pedro Tunasan in order to restore peace and order. While the conflict was ongoing, the town also witnessed the peasant-led Sakdal Uprising in the mid-1930s, with reports indicate that an attack by Sakdalistas in San Pedro was averted by the Constabulary.

With these issues at hand, the Commonwealth government under President Manuel Quezon were compelled to resolve the conflict as soon as possible. In 1936, the National Assembly passed Commonwealth Act No. 20, which authorized President Quezon to initiate expropriation proceedings or negotiate for the acquisition of landed estates and sell them to qualified individuals. President Quezon even invited the leaders of Samahang Oras Na and San Pedro municipal officials led by Mayor Ciriaco Limpiahoy to personally witness the signing of the said law.

Three years later, the Commonwealth acquired the 215 hectares (530 acres) of the Hacienda, and through the Rural Progress Administration, planned to sell it to the residents. This led to the division of the Samahang Oras Na to two factions: those who favored the government's solution, composed of the local intelligentsia and town elites, were called as "No Parking," while the San Pedrense masses who were advised by Atty. Juan Rustia and opposed the government's plan out of belief that the lands of the Hacienda should be automatically be owned by them were called as the "Yapak." This difference in beliefs led to tense relations between the two groups, with the Yapak members refusing to interact nor do business with the No Parking members.

The refusal of the Yapaks to recognize the ownership of the Colegio de San Jose to the Hacienda lands forced the government to sell their lands to other interested individuals. The municipal officials, led by Mayor Benedicto Austria, sided with the Yapak, prompting Quezon to suspend him and the Municipal Council in 1941, and replace them with a new set of municipal officials led by Jose L. Amante.

=== World War II and Japanese occupation (1941–1945) ===
During World War II, the Japanese entered San Pedro on January 1, 1942, and conquered the town for the next three years. San Pedro was among the routes used by the Imperial Japanese Army forces to reach Manila and occupy the national capital.

Out of fear from the advancing Japanese forces, the municipal officials at that time hurriedly evacuated to other towns, leaving their townmates behind. The Japanese then ordered the residents to elect their local officials, with former mayor Ciriaco Limpiajoy winning the polls. Despite this, the town was virtually controlled by a Japanese resident, Fujiwara Itizi, who acted as interpreter for the Japanese forces. During the Occupation, there were incidents of atrocities that occurred in the town, among them was a zonification ("sona") inflicted by the Japanese against the male residents in July 1944. In this event, the Japanese announced that the male residents, who were members of the Japanese-organized "bamboo army," would have a practice drill in the town plaza. Instead they were arrested and locked inside the San Pedro Apostol Parish for three days.

Some residents of San Pedro joined the guerilla movement and commanded units in Laguna. Among the guerrilla units who operated in San Pedro are the Fil-American Irregular Troops (FAIT) led by Capt. Felipe Alviar, and a branch of the Blue Lake Battalion, Hunters ROTC Guerrillas led by Lieutenant Antonio Partoza. One of the local residents, Abelardo Remoquillo, became a Hunters ROTC guerrilla commander in Eastern Laguna, and died during the liberation campaigns in Bay, Laguna on March 8, 1945. He was honored with a monument and his death anniversary declared as the San Pedro Veterans’ Day. Eventually, the FAIT and Hunters, together with the President Quezon's Own Guerrillas (PQOG), liberated San Pedro from Japanese control on February 7, 1945. Subsequently, Lt. Partoza, a lawyer by profession, was appointed by the Philippine Civil Affairs Unit (PCAU) as military mayor of San Pedro.

=== Post-war and martial law period (1946–1986) ===
The post-war years saw the prominence of San Pedro's sampaguita industry, with it becoming the country's leading producer of Sampaguita buds. However, the conflict over the lands of the Hacienda San Pedro Tunasan resumed once the war had ended. Because of their sheer numbers, the Yapaks continued to dominate the municipal leadership in the years after the war. They filed several cases against the Colegio de San Jose in the Court of First Instance, but these cases were eventually dismissed by the court. Their assertions continued despite the five-year suspension imposed by the Supreme Court of the Philippines against Rustia, and his subsequent death in 1951. In 1948, the Hacienda's administrator, N.V. Sinclair, gradually sold the remaining Hacienda lands to other individuals, even to non-San Pedrenses.

This forced the Yapaks, who were already called then as the Anak ng Bayan, to sought the help of the newly elected President Ramon Magsaysay. Magsaysay advised them to follow the court's decision, while at the same time ordering the government to investigate the case of Hacienda San Pedro Tunasan. Eventually, the Magsaysay administration decided to acquire the remaining 850 hectares of the Hacienda. On August 30, 1954, President Magsaysay visited San Pedro and witnessed at the town plaza the sale of the Hacienda San Pedro Tunasan to the government. He likewise signed there the Agricultural Tenancy Act (Republic Act No. 1199), which codified the different tenancy laws in the Philippines. The farm lots of the hacienda were bought by the Philippine government to be sold at cost to the tenants or occupants of the farm lots in Bayan-Bayanan under the Narra Settlement Project of the Magsaysay Administration. These resettlement areas are the present-day barangays Magsaysay, Riverside, United Bayanihan, United Better Living, Estrella, Langgam, Laram, and Bagong Silang.

San Pedro likewise benefited from the postwar commercialization and industrialization boom of Mega Manila as some companies and real estate developers established their factories and subdivisions within the town. The 1960s saw the gradual emergence of industrial estates and subdivisions in San Pedro. Among those who made San Pedro as their base of operations are Holland Milk Products Inc. (now Alaska Milk Corporation), Cosmos Bottling Corporation, ACLEM Paper Mills, Kimberly-Clark Philippines, Philippine Tobacco Flu Curing Corporation, Berbacs Chemicals, US Tobacco Corporation, and Trinity Lodge Mining Corporation. It was also in the 1960s when the Holiday Hills Golf Club (now Filipinas Golf Hallow Ridge) was built in Barangay San Antonio. Between 1964 and 1971, the National Government commenced the San Pedro Resettlement Project, with parcels of land that was part of the 850-hectare acquisition made in 1954 by President Magsaysay distributed to landless San Pedrenses and other settlers.

To further boost the urbanization of San Pedro, the Carmona Line of the Philippine National Railways was inaugurated in 1973. It was a spur line from San Pedro going to Carmona, Cavite (now General Mariano Alvarez, Cavite), passing thru Pacita Complex. In 1978, under Presidential Decree No. 1474, the Department of Agrarian Reform was ordered to convert the San Pedro Tunasan Estate to a commercial, industrial, and residential site, and transfer it afterwards to the National Housing Authority. These chain of events occurred under the administrations of Mayors Mario Brigola (1960–1963), Jose L. Amante (1964–1971), and Felicisimo Vierneza (1972–1986).

=== Contemporary history (1986–present) ===
Following the 1986 EDSA Revolution, President Corazon Aquino appointed the local leader of the anti-dictatorship movement, Calixto Cataquiz, as OIC-Mayor of San Pedro. Known as "Calex," it was during his administration that San Pedro's annual income increased, leading it to achieve the status as a first-class municipality in 1992. It was during his administration that the iconic San Pedro Welcome Arch was built, as well as the Jose L. Amante Emergency Hospital and the Gavino Alvarez Lying-in Clinic. In 1998, former mayor Vierneza was re-elected, thereby continuing the progress that was started by Mayor Calex, as manifested by the further establishment of subdivisions, business establishments, and the opening of the San Pedro Exit of the South Luzon Expressway.

On March 27, 2013, President Benigno Aquino III signed the Republic Act No. 10420, converting the municipality into a new component city of the province of Laguna. The cityhood of San Pedro was ratified through a plebiscite scheduled by the COMELEC on December 28, 2013, after the National Barangay Elections. With 16,996 "yes" votes over 869 "no" votes and an 11% turnout, it was proclaimed the sixth city of Laguna on December 29, 2013, after the cities of Biñan, Cabuyao, Calamba, San Pablo, and Santa Rosa, and also the third to be a city in the 1st congressional district of Laguna - making it the first city district in the province.

Once it achieved its cityhood status, there were proposals to make San Pedro part of the National Capital Region. Metropolitan Manila Development Authority (MMDA) Chairman Francis Tolentino pushed for the inclusion of the city in the National Capital Region, and eventually become its 18th member city. Tolentino said that in the first meeting of the MMDA Council of mayors in January 2015, he would push for the inclusion of the city to the MMDA. Otherwise, San Pedro could be the MMDA's second municipality after Pateros.

In 2015, due to its large population, San Pedro's Barangay San Vicente was split to eight barangays, namely: San Vicente, Pacita I, Pacita II, Chrysanthemum, Rosario, Fatima, San Lorenzo Ruiz, and Maharlika. This increased the number of San Pedro's barangays to 27. This was approved by the local population through a plebiscite. This was further reinforced when President Rodrigo Duterte signed Republic Act No. 11295 in 2019. In the same year, Senator Koko Pimentel sought the separation of the city of San Pedro from Laguna's 1st congressional district to constitute a lone congressional district. In 2015, he filed Senate Bill No. 3029 for the creation of the San Pedro as a separate district to commence in the next national and local elections. After the city of Santa Rosa formally gained its own representation effective 2022, San Pedro remained as the only local government unit in the first district. Hence, the 1st District may be also referred as the Lone District of San Pedro.

== Geography ==
San Pedro is located in Region IV-A or Calabarzon. San Pedro is the boundary between Laguna and Metro Manila, so San Pedro is known as "Laguna's Gateway to Metro Manila". San Pedro shares boundaries with Metro Manila's southernmost city, Muntinlupa (North) bounded by Tunasan River, Biñan (south), Dasmariñas (west), Carmona and General Mariano Alvarez (Southwest) bound with San Isidro River. Its position makes San Pedro a popular suburban residential community, where many residents commute daily to Metro Manila for work. It is also along the Marikina Valley fault system.

San Pedro is 58 kilometres (36 mi) from Santa Cruz and 29 kilometres (18 mi) from Manila.

=== Climate ===
Climate data for San Pedro City, Laguna
Month	Jan	Feb	Mar	Apr	May	Jun	Jul	Aug	Sep	Oct	Nov	Dec	Year
Mean daily maximum °C (°F)	29 (84)	30 (86)	32 (90)	34 (93)	32 (90)	31 (88)	29 (84)	29 (84)	29 (84)	30 (86)	30 (86)	29 (84)	30 (87)
Mean daily minimum °C (°F)	21 (70)	20 (68)	21 (70)	22 (72)	24 (75)	24 (75)	24 (75)	24 (75)	24 (75)	23 (73)	22 (72)	21 (70)	23 (73)
Average precipitation mm (inches)	10 (0.4)	10 (0.4)	12 (0.5)	27 (1.1)	94 (3.7)	153 (6.0)	206 (8.1)	190 (7.5)	179 (7.0)	120 (4.7)	54 (2.1)	39 (1.5)	1,094 (43)
Average rainy days	5.2	4.5	6.4	9.2	19.7	24.3	26.9	25.7	24.4	21.0	12.9	9.1	189.3
Source: Meteoblue

== Barangays ==
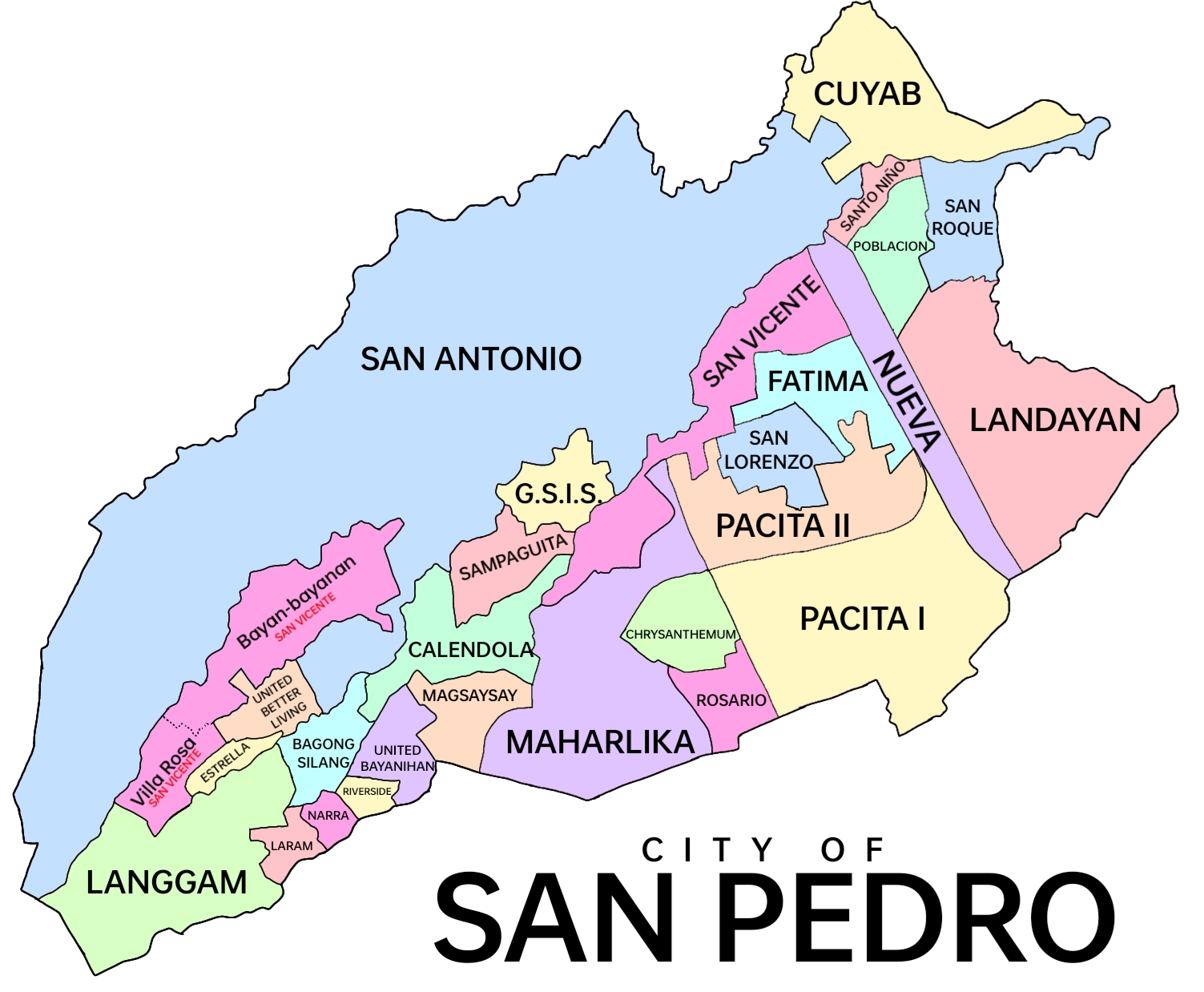
Political subdivisions of San Pedro

San Pedro is politically subdivided into 27 barangays, as indicated in the table below. Barangay San Antonio is the largest barangay, which has a total of 780 hectares (1,900 acres), while Barangay San Vicente is the most populous with a total population of 92,092.

List of barangays in the City of San Pedro
Barangay	Punong Barangay
Bagong Silang	Hon. Reinalyn Talaga
Calendola	Hon. Rodolfo Dimaunahan Jr.
Chrysanthemum	Hon. Restituto Hernandez
Cuyab	Hon. Al de Borja
Estrella	Hon. Jaime Madrigalejos
Fatima	Hon. Roberto Ordan
GSIS	Hon. John Andrian Tejido
Landayan	Hon. Gregorio Remoquillo
Langgam	Hon. Samuel Rivera
Laram	Hon. Merlito Edwin Palomar
Magsaysay	Hon. Vioquelin Pascual Jr.
Maharlika	Hon. Jesse James Ting
Narra	Hon. Ernesto Doncillo
Nueva	Hon. Edwin Matunog
Pacita 1	Hon. Fernando B. Malveda
Pacita 2	Hon. Gary Santos
Poblacion	Hon. Tracy Bedico
Riverside	Hon. Ariel Mendoza
Rosario	Hon. Fred Lawrence Vicedo
Sampaguita	Hon. Rex Labay
San Antonio	Hon. Albert Fojas
San Lorenzo Ruiz	Hon. Romeo Bonoan
San Roque	Hon. Larry Edward Licmo
San Vicente	Hon. Diwa Tayao
Santo Niño	Hon. Ramon Mamawag
United Bayanihan	Hon. Calixto Alviar
United Better Living	Hon. Bernabe Baldomar

== Demographics ==
Population census of San Pedro
Year	Pop.	±% p.a.
1903	3,678	—
1918	4,184	+0.86%
1939	6,300	+1.97%
1948	9,063	+4.12%
1960	14,082	+3.74%
1970	32,991	+8.88%
1975	43,439	+5.67%
1980	74,556	+11.40%
1990	156,486	+7.70%
1995	189,333	+3.63%
2000	231,403	+4.40%
2007	281,808	+2.76%
2010	294,310	+1.59%
2015	325,809	+1.96%
2020	326,001	+0.01%
2024	348,968	+1.65%
Source: Philippine Statistics Authority

San Pedro is the 37th most populous city in the Philippines. As of 2024, the population is 348,968 people, up from 294,310 in 2010, or an increase of almost 11%. Its area is 24.05 square kilometres (9.29 sq mi) with a density of 14,510/km^{2} (37,581/sq mi).

== Religion ==
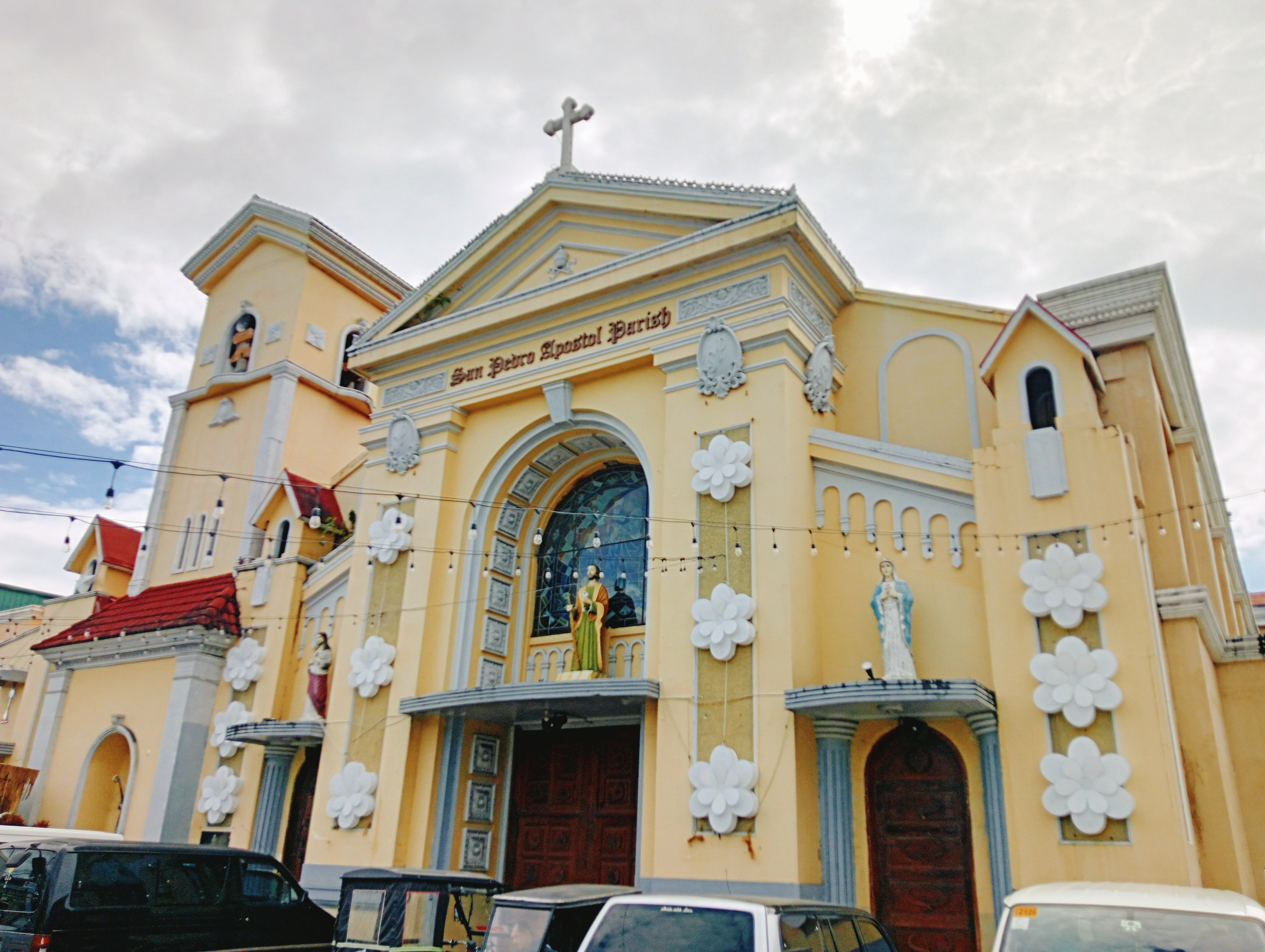
San Pedro Apostol Parish Church

There are 15 Roman Catholic parishes in San Pedro, under the jurisdiction of the Roman Catholic Diocese of San Pablo.

Roman Catholic parishes in San Pedro, Laguna
Name	Year established	Location	Administrators
San Pedro Apostol Parish	1725	Barangay Nueva	Diocesan clergy
Diocesan Shrine of Jesus in the Holy Sepulchre	1969	Barangay Landayan	Diocesan clergy
Christ the King Parish	1983	Barangay GSIS	Oblates of St. Joseph
Holy Family Parish	1983	Barangay Sampaguita	Diocesan clergy
Mother of Good Counsel Parish	1983	Barangay Chrysanthemum	Order of St. Augustine
Sto. Rosario Parish	1986	Barangay Pacita 1	Diocesan clergy
Most Holy Name of Jesus Parish	1987	Barangay Narra	Diocesan clergy
San Lorenzo Ruiz Parish	1990	Barangay Pacita II	Diocesan clergy
Our Lady of Fatima Parish	1991	Barangay Fatima	Oblates of St. Joseph
St. Joseph the Worker Parish	1995	Barangay Calendola	Diocesan clergy
Our Lady of the Most Holy Rosary Parish	1995	Barangay Rosario	Diocesan clergy
Our Lady of Lourdes Parish	1996	Barangay San Antonio	Diocesan clergy
San Martin de Porres Parish	1997	Barangay San Antonio	Diocesan clergy
Our Lady's Assumption Parish	2013	Barangay Cuyab	Diocesan clergy
St. Joseph the Patriarch Parish	2014	Barangay Langgam	Diocesan clergy

Other religious groups include are the Members Church of God International (MCGI), Lighthouse Apostolic Ministry of Pentecost (LAMP), Jesus Miracle Crusade International Ministry (JMCIM), United Church of Christ in the Philippines (UCCP), Jesus Is Lord Church (JIL), Jesus Christ the Lifegiver Ministries (JCLM), Christ Lord of Zion (CLOZ), and other full gospel churches under Christian Leaders Association of San Pedro (CLASP), Iglesia Ni Cristo (INC), The United Methodist Church, Presbyterian Churches, Christian Bible Baptist Church, other Baptist and Bible Fundamental churches. Islam is also practiced within the community. There are 15 Catholic parishes in the city, full gospel churches, and one mosque.

== Economy ==
Poverty incidence of San Pedro (%)

Source: Philippine Statistics Authority

Most economic activity in San Pedro is concentrated at San Antonio, also the city's largest and most populous barangay. Barangay Nueva, the city center, is home to a central public market (palengke) as well as clothing and homeware stores, and some supermarkets. San Pedro also has a large number of factories, most notably the Alaska Milk Corporation factory in San Antonio.

=== Agriculture ===
Agricultural land now comprises only about thirteen hectares of the total land area, largely due to conversion for residential, commercial, and industrial uses. Areas with slopes ranging from 8% to 15% are found in portions of Barangays San Antonio and San Vicente, where mango and siniguelas trees are cultivated. Livestock and poultry operations are also present in the municipality.

=== Commerce and industry ===
There are more than 4,700 total business establishments, 40+ commercial, savings and rural banks, 110+ restaurant, cafeteria, and other refreshment parlor, and two public and five private markets and supermarkets. There are 40 banks, over 60 pawnshops, over 30 lending institutions and 11 insurance companies operating in the city. Commercial and business establishments are mostly concentrated at Pacita Complex and Rosario. A large percentage of industrial and manufacturing establishments of San Pedro is located on the adjacent barangays of San Vicente and San Antonio; E&E Industrial Complex is located in San Antonio, where some of the city's factories are situated.

=== Malls ===
San Pedro has two major malls, Robinsons Galleria South (located in Barangay Nueva, opened in 2019) and SM Center San Pedro (located in Barangay United Bayanihan, opened in 2023).

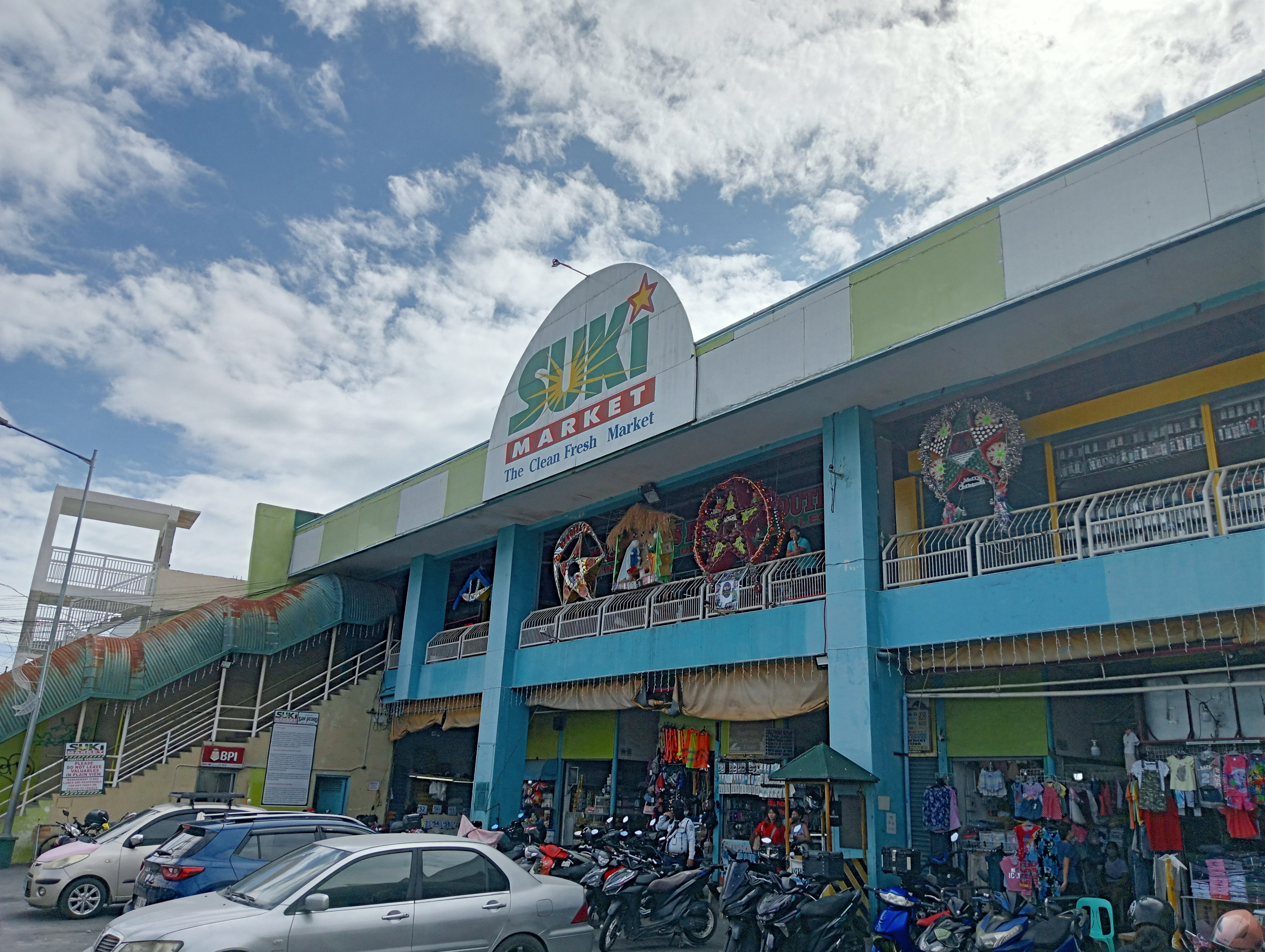
Suki Market

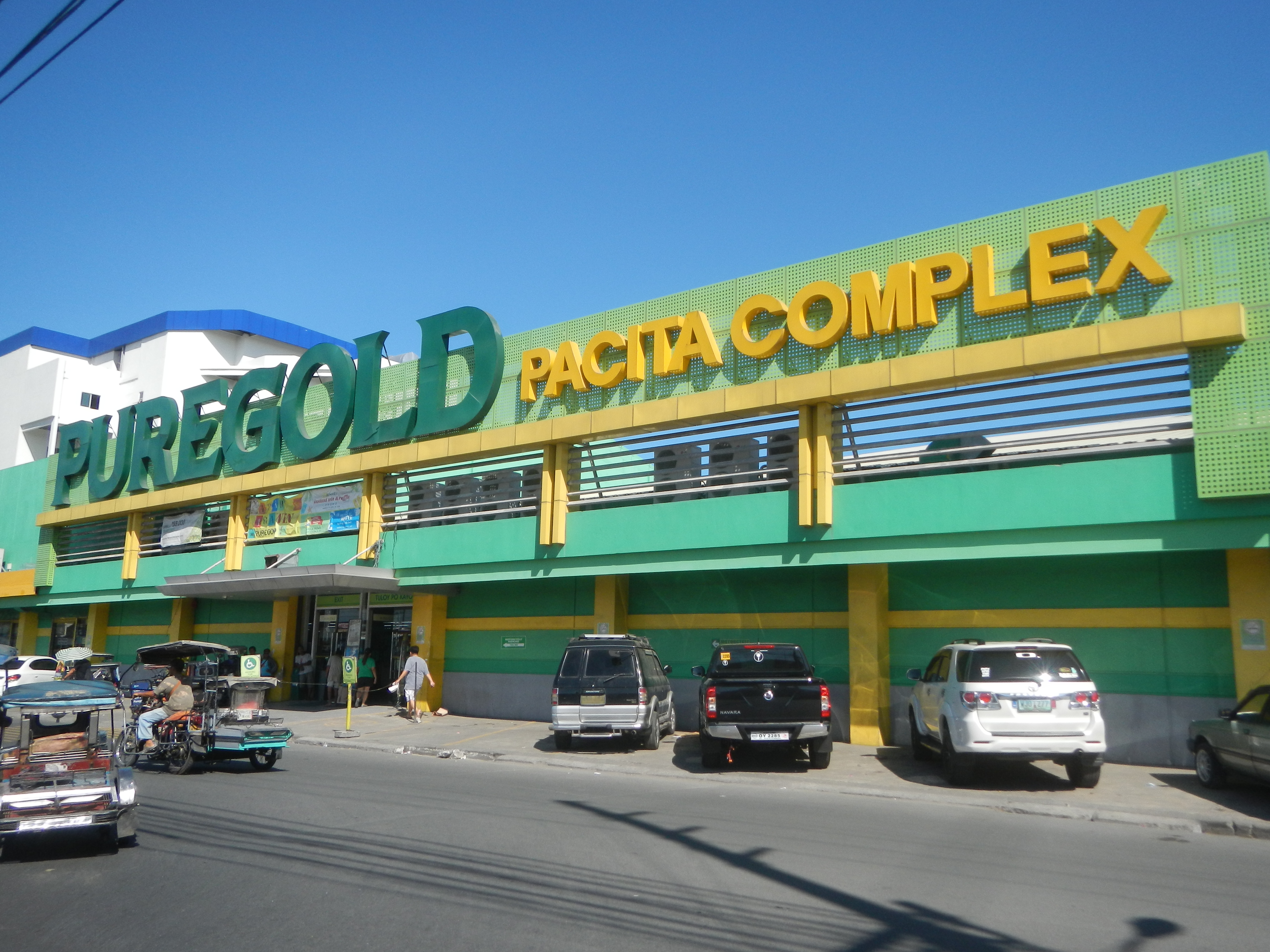
Puregold Pacita Complex

Robinsons Galleria South

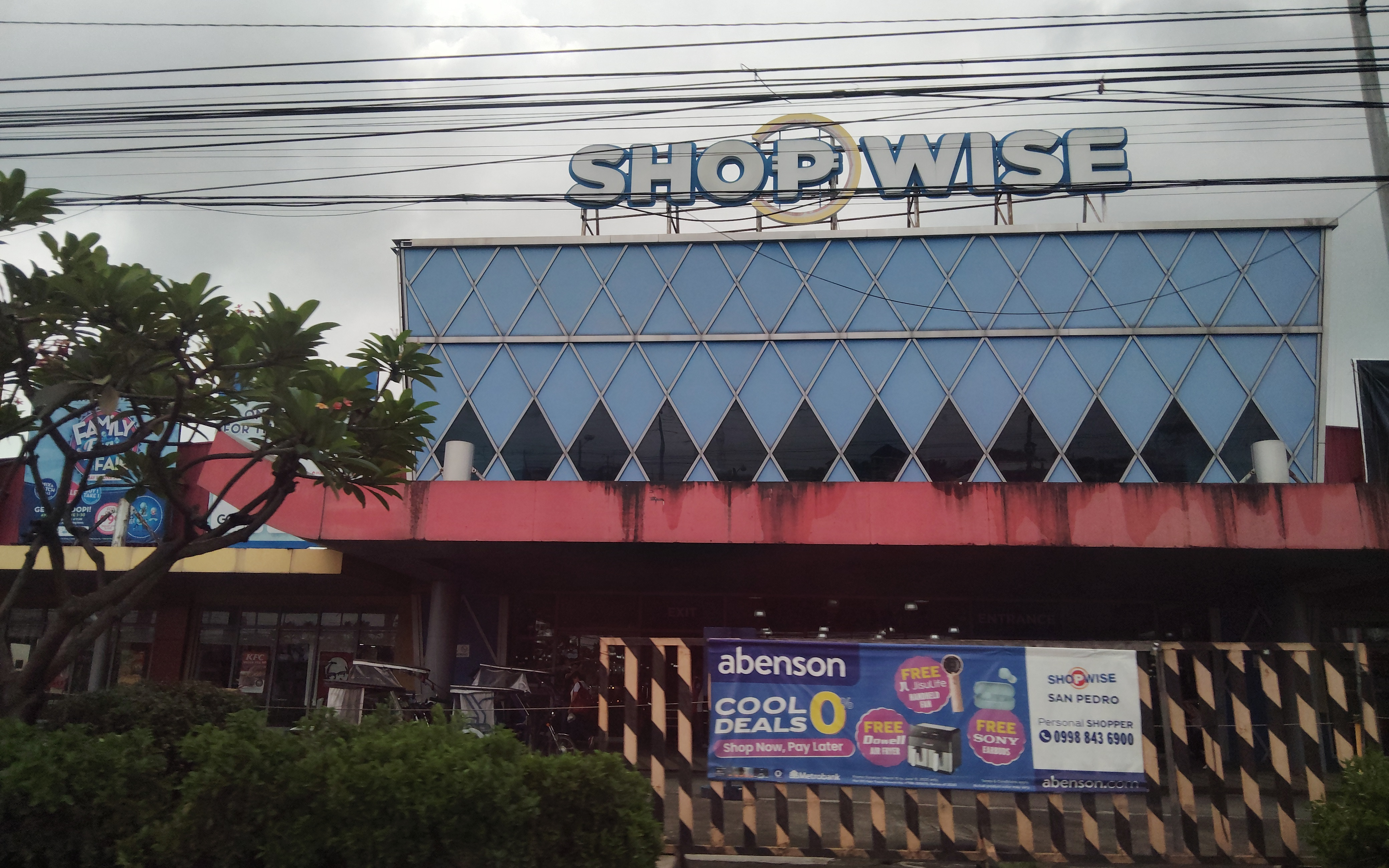
Shopwise San Pedro

== Transportation ==
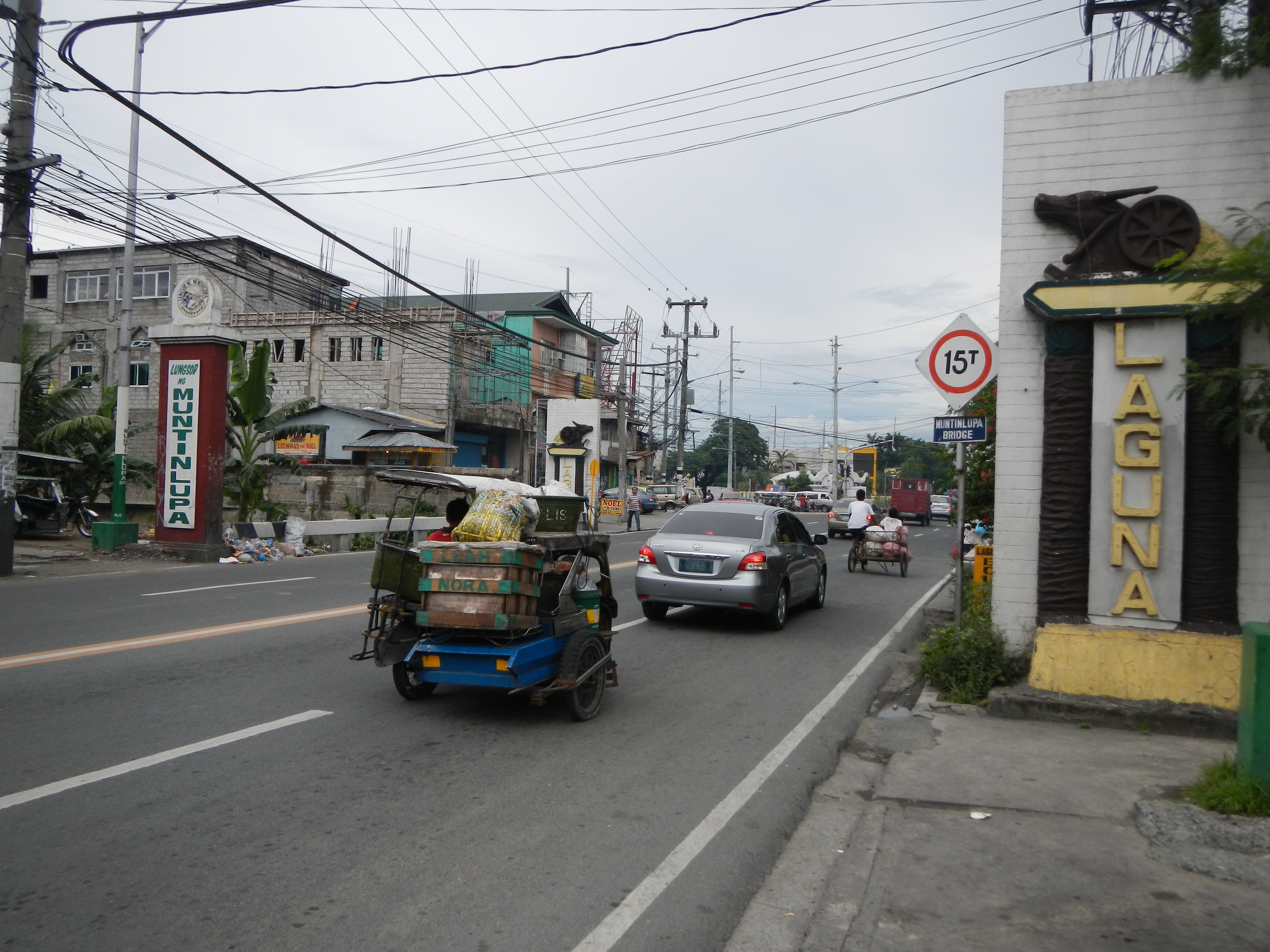
The National Highway at the boundary with Muntinlupa

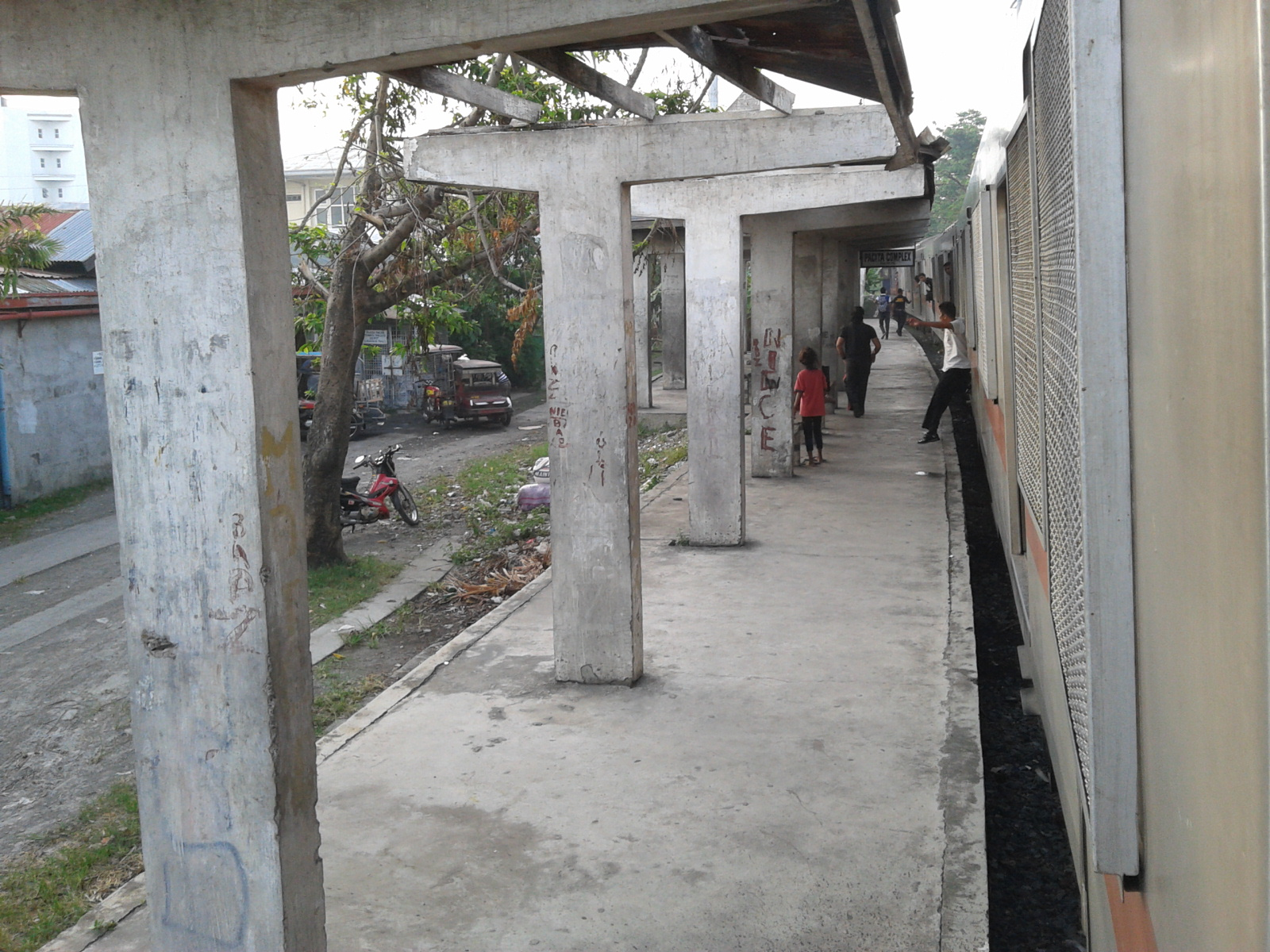
PNR Pacita MG station

San Pedro is traversed by the South Luzon Expressway.

The central bus terminal is at Pacita Complex.

The PNR Metro Commuter Line served the city, with two stations: San Pedro (at barangay San Vicente) and Pacita Main Gate (at Nueva).

== Education ==
- Jesus the Risen Savior School, San Antonio
- Laguna Northwestern College (formerly Laguna Northwestern Institute)
- Our Lady of Assumption College, Maharlika

== Government ==
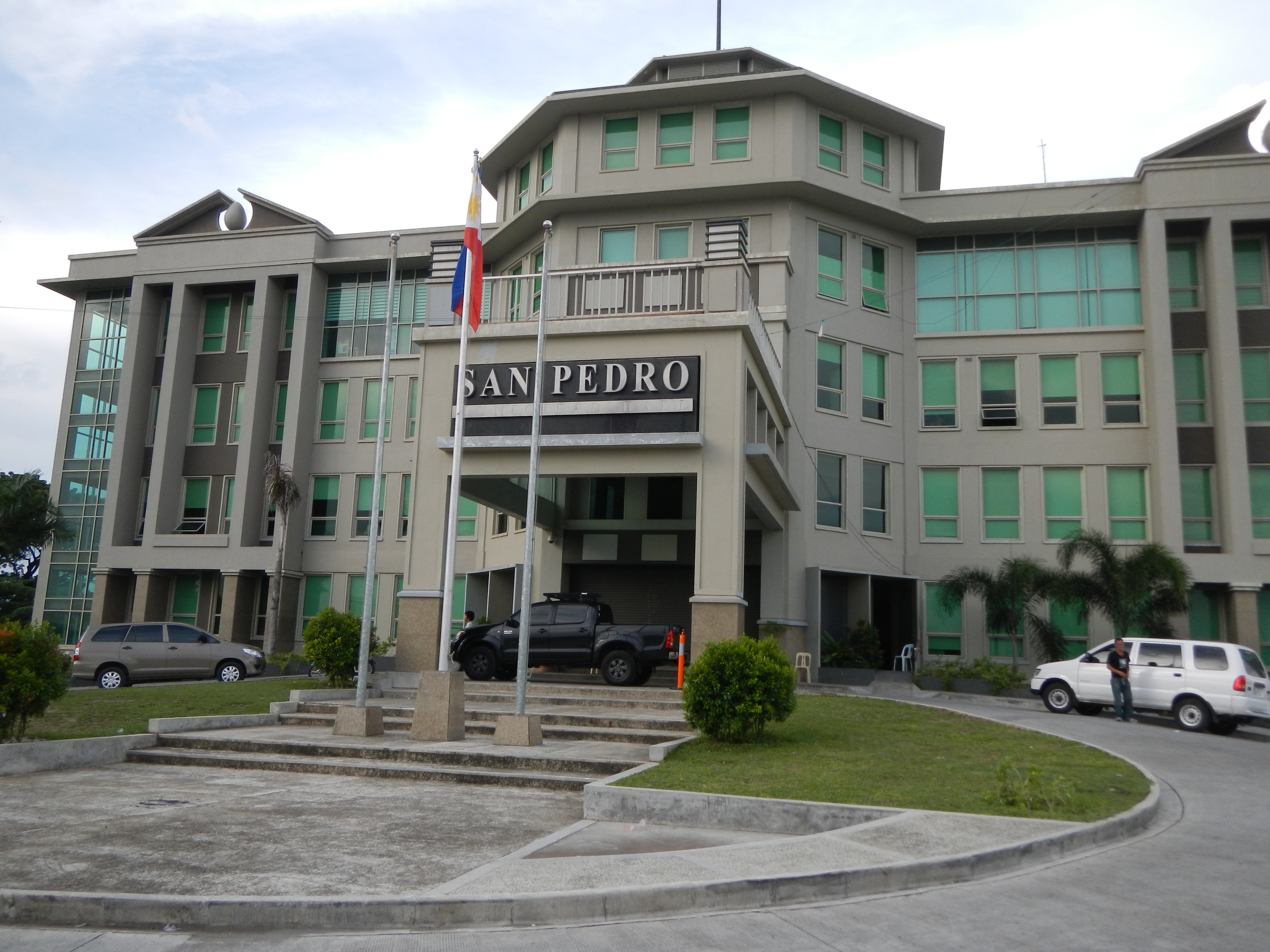
San Pedro City Hall

=== City council ===
San Pedro city officials (2022–2025)
Name	Party
House of Representatives
Ann Matibag	Lakas
City mayor
Art Joseph Francis Mercado	Lakas
City vice mayor
Sheriliz Niña B. Almoro	NUP
City councilors
Michael M. Casacop	Lakas
Atty. Mark S. Oliveros	Lakas
Leslie E. Lu	Lakas
Joie Chelsea V. Villegas	Lakas
Kent S. Lagasca	Lakas
Abraham S. Cataquiz	Nacionalista
Vincent Jude T. Solidum	Lakas
Maria Rosario P. Campos	Lakas
Aldrin Gerrold C. Mercado	Lakas
Mark Acierto	Lakas
Iryne V. Vierneza	PFP
Earl Gius Z. Castasus	PFP
Ex officio city council members
ABC president	Vioquelin B. Pascual, Jr. (Magsaysay)
SK Federation president	Raphael Antonio Ty (San Vicente)

=== List of former chief executives ===
Mayors of San Pedro, Laguna
Mayor	Year
Toribio Almeida	1901–1902
Pascual Mindo	1907–1908
Jose M. Guevara	1908–1910
Apolonio Morando	1910–1912
Francisco Amante	1912–1916
Tiburcio Morando	1916–1921; 1922–1925
Jose H. Guevara	1921–1922
Victor Vergara	1925–1926
Ricardo Almeida	1926–1928
Jose M. Martinez	1928–1934
Ciriaco Limpiahoy	1934–1940; 1942–1945
Benedicto Austria	1941; 1948–1955
Jose L. Amante	1941; 1946–1947; 1964–1971
Antonio Partoza Sr.	1945
Gavino Alvarez	1956–1959
Mario Brigola	1960–1963
Felicisimo Vierneza	1971–1986; 1998–2007
Calixto Cataquiz	1986–1998; 2007–2013
Ernesto Climaco	1988
Norvic Solidum	2013
Lourdes Sibulo Cataquiz	2013–2022
Art Joseph Francis Mercado	2022–present

== Notable people ==
=== Entertainment ===
- Kakai Bautista, comedian
- Rico Blanco, singer, former vocalist of Rivermaya
- Jiggly Caliente, actress, drag queen
- Julia Clarete, TV host, actress
- John Lloyd Cruz, actor, model
- Jane de Leon, actress
- Ogie Diaz, comedian, columnist and TV host
- Paw Diaz, actress
- Marlann Flores, actress
- Nathalie Hart, actress
- Kristine Hermosa, actress
- Jan Manual, actor
- Rocco Nacino, actor
- Gladys Reyes, actress
- J. Rey Soul, singer, member of the Black Eye Peas
- Nikki Valdez, actress
- Jake Zyrus, singer, songwriter

=== Politics ===
- Salvador Laurel, 8th vice president of the Philippines (under Corazon C. Aquino), 5th prime minister of the Philippines

=== Journalism and broadcasting ===
- Rene Alviar, journalist
- Tony Calvento, print/broadcast journalist for The Calvento Files

=== Sports ===
- Kyla Atienza, volleyball player
- Jema Galanza, PVL MVP, UAAP Beach Volleyball champion for Adamson University Lady Falcons
- Mafe Galanza, volleyball player
- Chris Javier, basketball player
- KarlTzy, eSports player
- Gilbert Malabanan, basketball player and coach
- Mean Mendrez, volleyball player
- Mayang Nuique, volleyball player
- Joshua Retamar, volleyball player
- Maoi Roca, basketball player, actor
