= Our Lady of Assumption College =

Private college in Laguna, Philippines

- Former name: Our Lady of Assumption School
- Type: Private Non-Sectarian Coeducational Basic and Higher education institution
- Established: 1989; 37 years ago
- President: Maximo C. Acierto, Jr.
- Vice-president: Ethelwyn A. Acierto (VP for Operations)
- Directress: Ethelwyn A. Acierto
- Faculty: 130
- Location: Provinces of Laguna and Batangas, Philippines; 14°20′36″N 121°02′25″E
- Campus: Urban and Suburban Laguna campuses San Pedro Santa Rosa Cabuyao Batangas campus Tanauan
- Language: English and Tagalog
- Alma Mater song: OLAC Hymn
- Colors: Blue and Gold
- Nickname: OLAC Blue Knights
- Mascot: Blue Knights
- Website: www.ourladyofassumptioncollege.com
- Location in Laguna Location in Luzon Location in the Philippines

Our Lady of Assumption College is a private and non sectarian school of south Metro Manila established in 1989. Our Lady of Assumption College is recognized by the Department of Education and the Commission on Higher Education.

== See also ==
- San Pedro, Laguna
- Santa Rosa, Laguna
- Mamatid, Cabuyao
- Cabuyao, Laguna
- Tanauan, Batangas
