= Mayor of Cabuyao =

Provincial Filipino authority

- Incumbent; Dennis Felipe C. Hain since June 30, 2022
- Style: (Mr.) Mayor, Honorable Mayor
- Residence: Sala, Cabuyao
- Appointer: Elected via popular vote
- Term length: 3 years
- Inaugural holder: Capt. Sotero Batallones
- Formation: September 7, 1904
- Website: Cabuyao Official Website

The mayor of Cabuyao (Filipino: Punong Lungsod ng Kabuyaw) is the highest ranking-officer and serves as the chief executive of the city. He enforces all laws and ordinances relative to the governance of the city and in the exercise of its appropriate corporate powers, as well as implements all approved policies, programs, projects, services and activities of the city. The mayor has a term of office of three years, but has a maximum electoral tenure of three consecutive terms.

During the American period, the first town mayor of Cabuyao was Captain Sotero Batallones after he peacefully surrendered to the Americans through the intervention of his nephew, Jose Batallones. He was temporarily removed from office when he was suspected as part of the party that abducted prominent residents of Cabuyao in July 1904. Luis Bella, the vice mayor then of Mayor Batallones, was installed as the town mayor. On September 7, 1904, Captain Sotero Batallones reassumed her position as mayor of Cabuyao.

The present 1987 Constitution of the Philippines defined the position, powers and responsibilities of the mayor as well as the city charter.

== List ==
=== Town of Tabuko (1571-1904) ===
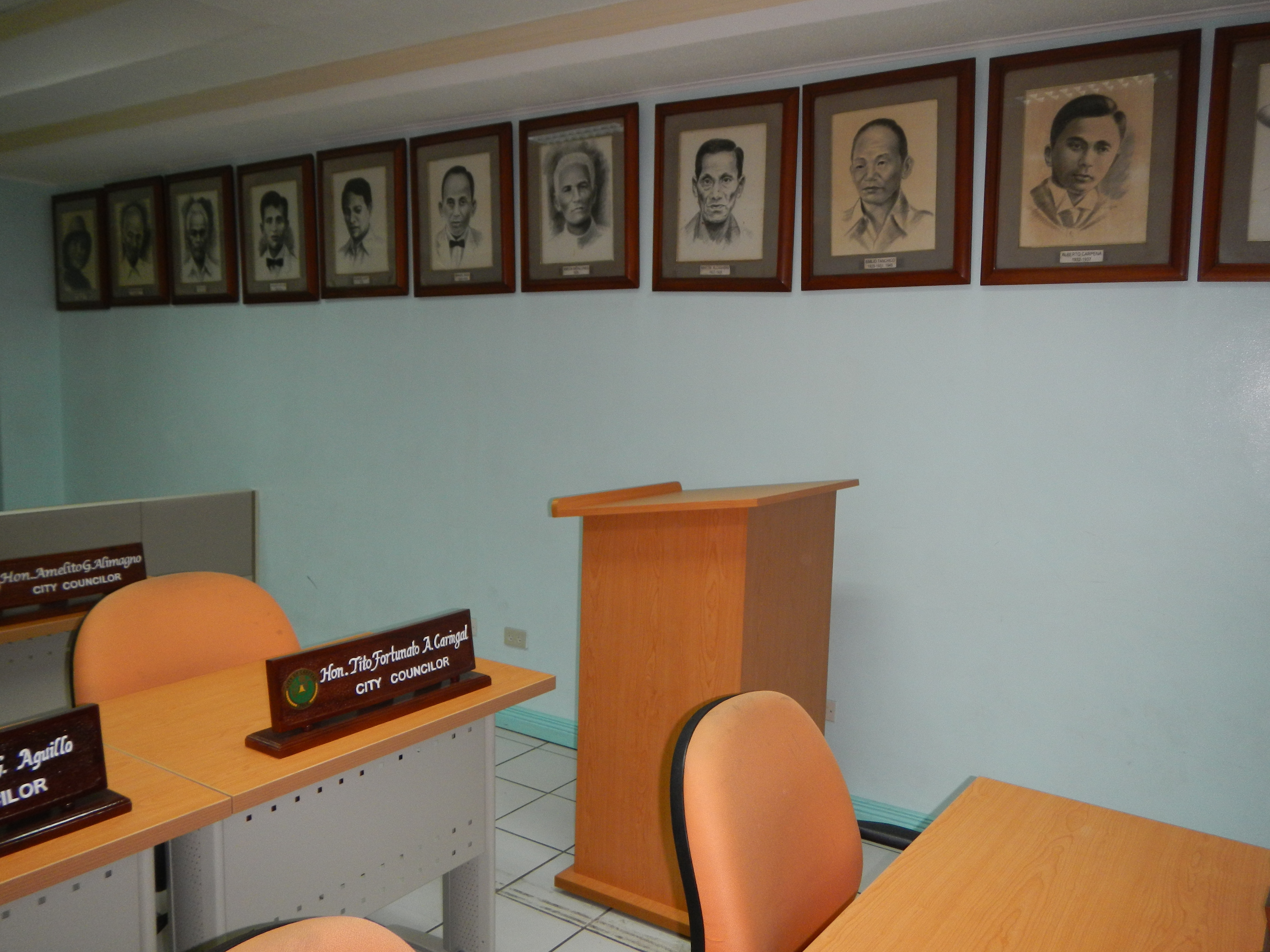
Portraits of former mayors are displayed inside the session hall

- 1571 Gaspar Ramirez

=== Municipality of Cabuyao (1904-2012) ===
==== American Era ====
No.	Name	From	To	Party	Notes
1	Capt. Sotero Batallones	1904	1913		During his term as mayor of Cabuyao, he accomplished many development projects. He was instrumental in the construction of the school building at Bagong Kalsada, which is now Bonifacio Street. This building is now the Cabuyao Central School. On the same year, an artesian well was constructed at the town plaza and another at the new school site.
2	Agustin Dedicatoria	1913	1916		He was instrumental in the construction of the monument of our Dr. Jose Rizal at the town plaza and the establishment of the new municipal cemetery at the southwestern portions of the town somewhere the area of Puntod.
3	Jose Bella	1917	1919		He gave priority on the improvement of education and school buildings. He was also instrumental in the planting of mango trees around the town plaza and construction of school building at Barangay Mamatid and Pulo.
4	Januario Virtucio	1920	1923		
5	Exequiel Alipit	1923	1923		He was elected as mayor of Cabuyao but he was questioned because of his age. He was not of legal age when he was elected as required by law during that time. However, he served as mayor because he insisted that the people elected him to the position and not on the technicality of law. The case reached the Supreme Court which eventually decided on his disqualification from office.
6	Manuel Basa	1923	1925		He was the vice mayor of Exequiel Alipit, he replaced Alipit after his disqualification from office.
7	Simeon Batallones	1926	1926		He was commonly known as "Bargat" because he was brave enough to fight and control the cattle rustlers of the town. Like Mayor Alipit, he was not in good terms with the members of the municipal council and as such, he was not able to complete his term of office.
8	Martin Alcasabas	1927	1928		Vice mayor of Simeon Batallones who succeeded his position.
9	Emilio Tanchico	1929	1931		He was the first mayor elected from a poor family. He used his good public relations and intellect as assets to be elected as mayor. During his administration, he exerted efforts so that electricity can reach Cabuyao. He also prepared the site where the public market formerly located near the church was transferred, Kamino Real, now called J.P. Rizal Avenue.
10	Dr. Alberto Carpena	1932	1937		The first re-elected mayor of Cabuyao. His main thrust of government was community hygiene; free medical services were conducted. He was responsible for the construction of the Domestic Science Building located at the Central School of Cabuyao. He was also responsible for widening the road going to the public cemetery and other improvements at the public market such as construction of its concrete fence.
11	Nicolas Limcaoco	1937	1941		His accomplishments included the construction of road from Poblacion to Barangay Marinig which shortened the travel time going to the different barangays along the coastal area of the town, and the installation of water line from Matang Tubig at Casile to Poblacion.

==== Japanese Occupation ====
No.	Name	From	To	Party	Notes
12	Jose L. Acuña	1941	1943		

==== Liberation Period ====
No.	Name	From	To	Party	Notes
13	Juan Dinulos	1944	1945		
14	Enrique Hemedes	1945	1945		
–	Emilio Tanchico	1945	1945		
–	Nicolas Limcaoco	1945	1945		
–	Jose L. Acuña	1946	1947		
15	Lope B. Diamante	1948	1951		
16	Mauro M. Alimagno	1952	1963		served as mayor for three terms.
17	Antonio H. Bailon	1964	1967		
–	Mauro M. Alimagno	1968	1979		served again as mayor but did not complete his term after he was assassinated in Calamba in 1980.
18	Nicanor Alcasabas	1980	1986		
19	Isidro T. Hildawa	1986	1986	PDP–Laban	appointed by President Corazon Aquino in February 1986 after the EDSA Revolution. However, he was later appointed as member of the Provincial Board of Laguna.
–	Constancio G. Alimagno Jr.	1986	1988		appointed as mayor on April 1, 1986.
20	Proceso D. Aguillo	1988	1992	Lakas–CMD	Elected as mayor for one term.
21	Constancio G. Alimagno Jr.	1992	1995		served again as mayor for one term.
–	Proceso D. Aguillo	1995	2004	Lakas–CMD	served as mayor for three terms. Founded and established Pamantasan ng Cabuyao, honored and awarded as first Municipality in Laguna with a university and with no incurred debt for its construction.
22	Nila G. Aguillo	2004	2007	Lakas–CMD	First female mayor of Cabuyao. Wife of Proceso D. Aguillo.
23	Isidro L. Hemedes Jr.	2007	2016	Nacionalista	Last mayor of Cabuyao as a municipality. Term extended until the cityhood of Cabuyao.

=== City of Cabuyao (since 2012) ===
	Name	From	To	Party	Notes
23	Isidro L. Hemedes Jr.	2012	2016	Nacionalista	First city mayor of Cabuyao, Under his last term he preceded the construction of school classrooms and arches and the construction/rehabilitation of Cabuyao public market to be known as cabuyao retail plaza.
24	Rommel A. Gecolea	2016	2022	PDP–Laban	Second city mayor of cabuyao, established the Cabuyao Institute of Technology, Cabuyao Command Center, Cabuyao Athletes Basic School and the New Cabuyao City Hospital.
25	Dennis Felipe C. Hain	2022		Aksyon	Third city mayor of Cabuyao

== History of the City Government ==
The following lists incorporate all people who became members of the city council or the Sangguniang Panlungsod of Cabuyao. The city council is always headed by the presiding officer, the City vice mayor.

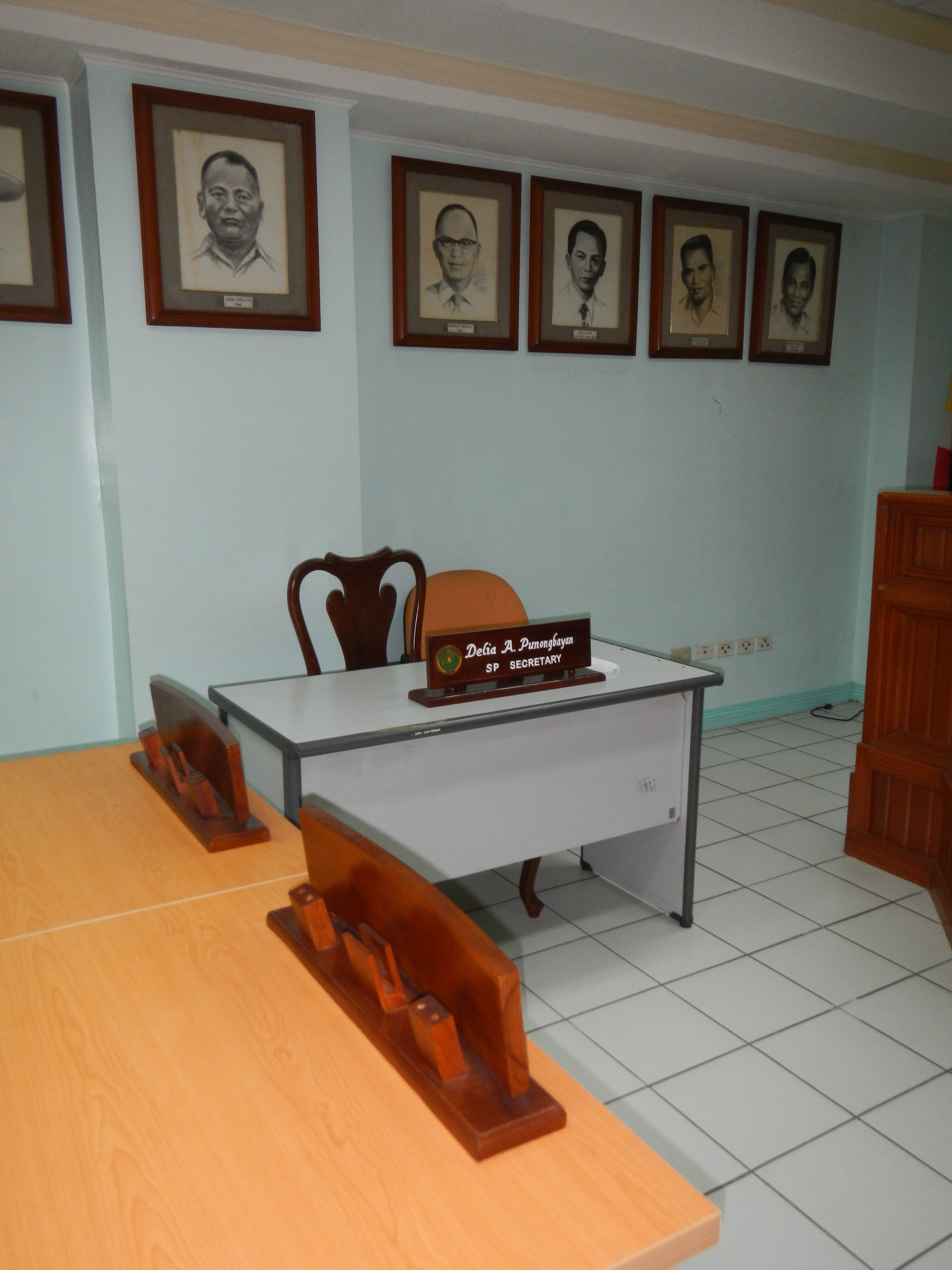
Session hall with portraits of former mayors of the city

=== City council, 2013-2016 ===
Members of the Cabuyao City Council (2013-2016)
Position	Name	Party
City Mayor	Isidro "Jun" L. Hemedes Jr.	Nacionalista
City Vice Mayor	Rommel A. Gecolea	Nacionalista
City; Councilors	Jaime Onofre R. Batallones	Liberal
City; Councilors	Ismael M. Hemedes	Nacionalista
City; Councilors	Leif Laiglon A. Opiña	Liberal
City; Councilors	Richard C. Hain	Nacionalista
City; Councilors	Apolinario B. Hain	Nacionalista
City; Councilors	Tito Fortunato A. Caringal	Liberal
City; Councilors	Benjamin C. del Rosario	Liberal
City; Councilors	Jose Benson G. Aguillo	Liberal
City; Councilors	Amelito G. Alimagno	Liberal
City; Councilors	Imelda A. Entredicho	Nacionalista
Ex Officio City Council Members
ABC President	Severiano B. Hain (Niugan)	Nonpartisan

=== City council, 2012-2013 ===
Members of the city council, 2012-2013
Position	Name	Party
City Mayor	Isidro L. Hemedes Jr.	Nacionalista Party
City Vice Mayor	Rommel A. Gecolea	Nacionalista Party
City; Councilors	Christian G. Aguillo	Liberal Party
City; Councilors	Jose G. Alcabasa Jr.	Nacionalista Party
City; Councilors	Maria Wanda C. Alimagno	Aksyon Demokratiko
City; Councilors	Imelda A. Entredicho	Nacionalista Party
City; Councilors	Apolinario B. Hain	Nacionalista Party
City; Councilors	Ismael M. Hemedes	Nacionalista Party
City; Councilors	Leif Leiglon A. Opiña	Aksyon Demokratiko
City; Councilors	Ricky A. Voluntad	Liberal Party
City; Councilors	(vacant)	
City; Councilors	(vacant)	
Ex Officio City Council Members
ABC President	Severiano B. Hain	(Niugan)
SK President	Mark Kevin A. Urbina	(Niugan)

== History of the Municipal Government ==
The following lists incorporate all people who became members of the municipal council or the Sangguniang Bayan of Cabuyao. The municipal council is always headed by the presiding officer, the municipal vice mayor.

=== Municipal council, 2010-2012 ===
Members of the municipal council, 2010-2012
Position	Name	Party
Mayor	Isidro L. Hemedes Jr.	Nacionalista Party
Vice Mayor	Rommel A. Gecolea	Nacionalista Party
Municipal; Councilors	Christian G. Aguillo	Liberal Party
Municipal; Councilors	Jose "Jimbo" G. Alcabasa Jr.	Nacionalista Party
Municipal; Councilors	Maria Wanda C. Alimagno	Aksyon Demokratiko
Municipal; Councilors	Imelda A. Entredicho	Nacionalista Party
Municipal; Councilors	Apolinario "Pol" B. Hain	Nacionalista Party
Municipal; Councilors	Ismael "Cocoy" M. Hemedes	Nacionalista Party
Municipal; Councilors	Leif Leiglon A. Opiña	Aksyon Demokratiko
Municipal; Councilors	Ricky A. Voluntad	Liberal Party
Ex Officio City Council Members
ABC President	Severiano "Banoy" B. Hain	(Niugan)
SK President	Jervis Himpisao	(Mamatid)

=== Municipal council, 2007-2010 ===
Members of the municipal council, 2007-2010
Position	Name	Party
Mayor	Isidro L. Hemedes Jr.	KAMPI
Vice Mayor	Benjamin C. del Rosario	Lakas–CMD
Municipal; Councilors	Maria Wanda C. Alimagno	United Opposition
Municipal; Councilors	Jose M. Laviña	Lakas–CMD
Municipal; Councilors	Rommel A. Gecolea	KAMPI
Municipal; Councilors	Jose Benson G. Aguillo	Lakas–CMD
Municipal; Councilors	Apolinario B. Hain	KAMPI
Municipal; Councilors	Jose G. Alcabasa Jr.	Lakas–CMD
Municipal; Councilors	Lope J. Diamante Jr.	Lakas–CMD
Municipal; Councilors	Ernani J. Delfinado	Lakas–CMD
Ex Officio City Council Members
ABC President	Severiano B. Hain	(Niugan)
SK President	Kenjie Norbertus G. del Rosario	(Niugan)

=== Municipal council, 2004-2007 ===
Members of the municipal council, 2004-2007
Position	Name	Party
Mayor	Nila G. Aguillo	Lakas–CMD
Vice Mayor	Isidro L. Hemedes Jr.	Lakas–CMD
Municipal; Councilors	Leif Laiglon A. Opiña	Independent
Municipal; Councilors	Jose Benson G. Aguillo	Lakas–CMD
Municipal; Councilors	Jose M. Laviña	Lakas–CMD
Municipal; Councilors	Ernani J. Delfinado	Lakas–CMD
Municipal; Councilors	Lope J. Diamante Jr.	Lakas–CMD
Municipal; Councilors	Maria Wanda C. Alimagno	PDP–Laban
Municipal; Councilors	Luzviminda J. Alcabasa	Lakas–CMD
Municipal; Councilors	Rommel A. Gecolea	PDP–Laban
Ex Officio City Council Members
ABC President	Benjamin C. del Rosario	(Niugan)
SK President	Ismael M. Hemedes	(Sala)

=== Municipal council, 2001-2004 ===
Members of the municipal council, 2001-2004
Position	Name	Party
Mayor	Proceso D. Aguillo	Lakas–CMD
Vice Mayor	Isidro L. Hemedes Jr.	Lakas–CMD
Councilors	Jose Benson G. Aguillo.	

== Elections ==
- 1998 Cabuyao local elections
- 2001 Cabuyao local elections
- 2004 Cabuyao local elections
- 2007 Cabuyao local elections
- 2010 Cabuyao local elections
- 2013 Cabuyao local elections
- 2016 Cabuyao local elections
- 2019 Cabuyao local elections
- 2022 Cabuyao local elections

== See also ==
- Cabuyao, Laguna
- Laguna
- History of Cabuyao
