= Cabuyao (disambiguation) =

Cabuyao is a city in Laguna, Philippines.

Cabuyao may also refer to:

- Cabuyao (fruit), common name for two species of wild citrus:

- Citrus hystrix
- Citrus macroptera

- Cabuyao railway station, a station of Philippine National Railways
- Cabuyao University, Pamantasan ng Cabuyao, in the Philippines

== Others ==
- Cabuyao local elections, 2013, local elections in the city of Cabuyao, Philippines held in 2013
- Cabuyao City Council, city council of the city of Cabuyao in the Philippines.
