= 2013 Cabuyao local elections =

Philippine election

2013 Cabuyao mayoral election
- May 13, 2013
	NP	LP
Nominee	Isidro "Jun" L. Hemedes Jr.	Nila G. Aguillo
Party	Nacionalista	Liberal
Running mate	Rommel "Mel" A. Gecolea	Maria Wanda C. Alimagno
Popular vote	51,719	39,758
Percentage	55.65	43.35
Mayor before election
Isidro "Jun" L. Hemedes Jr.
Nacionalista
Elected mayor
Isidro "Jun L. Hemedes Jr.
Nacionalista

Local elections were held in Cabuyao on May 13, 2013 within the Philippine general election. The total number of voters registered in the City of Cabuyao is 135,713 in 586 voting precincts. The voters elected for the elective local posts in the city: the mayor, vice mayor, and ten councilors.

Cabuyao is a newly created city in the province of Laguna by virtue of Republic Act No. 10163 or the "Charter of the City of Cabuyao" ratified on August 4, 2012 by its people. Voters will no longer vote for eight councilors but they will elect ten city councilors as prescribed in the charter.

== Overview ==
Incumbent Mayor Isidro "Jun" L. Hemedes Jr. decided to run for re-election under the Nacionalista Party, he was elected as Mayor since 2007 after defeating former Mayor Proceso "Etok" Aguillo in 2007 local elections. His opponent was former Mayor Nila Aguillo, the wife of Etok Aguillo, she is under the Liberal Party.

Hemedes' running mate is the incumbent Vice-Mayor Rommel "Mel" Gecolea. His opponent is city councilor Maria Wanda Alimagno, the running mate of Nila Aguillo.

Each team had their own set of ten candidates for city council. Nacionalista Party/Administration team was composed of five re-election candidates, Barangay Pulo Chairman Odilon I. Caparas and Barangay Marinig Chairman Emiliano T. Lirio and three other candidates. Under the Liberal Party/Opposition team were two re-election candidates, former vice-mayor Benjamin C. del Rosario, Barangay Sala Chairman Amelito G. Alimagno, Barangay Mamatid Councilor Gabriel Bariring. Notable candidates for Cabuyao City Council were Anna Liza Baldonado or popularly known as "Milagring" of the defunct TV program Wowowee and 6 Cycle Mind lead vocalist Tutti Caringal.

== Candidates ==
Position		Liberal Party		Nacionalista Party		Independents	
Mayor		Liberal	Nila Aguillo	Nacionalista	Isidro Hemedes Jr.		
Vice Mayor		Liberal	Maria Wanda Alimagno	Nacionalista	Rommel Gecolea		
Member of the Cabuyao City Council	Lone district	Liberal	Christian Aguillo; Jose Benson Aguillo; Amelito Alimagno; Alexander Angeles; Milagring Baldonado; Gabriel Bariring Jr.; Jaime Onofre Batallones; Tutti Caringal; Benjamin C. del Rosario; Leif Laiglon Opiña	Nacionalista	Jose Alcabasa Jr.; Odilon Caparas; Flaviano Dizon; Imelda Entredicho; Ismael Hemedes; Apolinario Hain; Richard Hain; Emiliano Lirio; Ricky Voluntad; Simplicio Tolentino	Independent	Ramon Anciro

== Results ==
=== Mayoral elections ===
The candidates for mayor with the highest number of votes wins the seat; they are voted separately, therefore, they may be of different parties when elected.

2013 Cabuyao mayoral election
Party	Candidate	Votes	%
Nacionalista	Isidro L. Hemedes Jr.	51,719	54.62
Liberal	Nila G. Aguillo	39,578	41.80
Margin of victory		12,141	12.82%
Invalid or blank votes		3,386	3.58
Total votes		94,683	100.00
Nacionalista gain from Liberal			

=== Vice-mayoral elections ===
The candidates for Vice-mayor with the highest number of votes wins the seat; they are voted separately, therefore, they may be of different parties when elected.

2013 Cabuyao vice mayoral election
Party	Candidate	Votes	%
Nacionalista	Rommel A. Gecolea	46,619	49.24
Liberal	Maria Wanda C. Alimagno	42,435	44.82
Margin of victory		4,184	4.42%
Invalid or blank votes		5,629	5.94
Total votes		94,683	100.00
Nacionalista gain from Liberal			

=== City Council Elections ===
Voters elected ten councilors to comprise the City Council or the Sangguniang Panlungsod. Candidates were voted separately so there are chances where winning candidates will have unequal number of votes and may come from different political parties. The ten candidates with the highest number of votes win the seats.

2013 Cabuyao City Council
Party	Candidate	Votes	%
Liberal	Jaime Onofre R. Batallones	50,251	6.76
Nacionalista	Ismael M. Hemedes	47,523	6.39
Liberal	Leif Laiglon A. Opiña	47,210	6.35
Nacionalista	Richard C. Hain	44,350	5.97
Nacionalista	Apolinario B. Hain	43,694	5.88
Liberal	Tito Fortunato "Tutti" A. Caringal	43,684	5.88
Liberal	Benjamin C. del Rosario	42,705	5.74
Liberal	Jose Benson G. Aguillo	40,627	5.47
Liberal	Amelito G. Alimagno	40,335	5.43
Nacionalista	Imelda A. Entredicho	40,267	5.42
Liberal	Christian G. Aguillo	35,527	4.78
Nacionalista	Ricky A. Voluntad	33,641	4.53
Nacionalista	Emiliano T. Lirio	32,978	4.44
Nacionalista	Odilon I. Caparas	30,973	4.17
Nacionalista	Jose G. Alcabasa Jr.	30,582	4.11
Liberal	Annaliza "Milagring" C. Baldonado	29,755	4.00
Liberal	Gabriel C. Bariring Jr.	29,584	3.98
Liberal	Alexander E. Angeles	26,783	3.60
Nacionalista	Simplicio S. Tolentino	26,265	3.53
Nacionalista	Flaviano V. Dizon	23,943	3.22
Independent	Ramon N. Anciro	2,678	0.36
Total votes		94,683	100
