= 2016 Cabuyao local elections =

2016 Cabuyao mayoral election
- May 9, 2016
	PDPLBN	LP
Nominee	Rommel Gecolea	Julio Alcasabas
Party	PDP–Laban	Liberal
Running mate	N/A	Jose Benson Aguillo
Popular vote	43,604	40,082
Percentage	34.30	31.60
	NP	UNA
Nominee	Ismael Hemedes	Jaime Batallones
Party	Nacionalista	UNA
Running mate	Isidro L. Hemedes, Jr.	Benjamin Del Rosario
Popular vote	26,719	16,604
Percentage	21.00	13.10
Mayor before election
Isidro "Jun" L. Hemedes, Jr.
Nacionalista
Elected mayor
Rommel Gecolea
PDP–Laban

Local elections were held in Cabuyao on May 9, 2016, within the Philippine general election. The voters elected for the elective local posts in the city: the mayor, vice mayor, and ten councilors.

== Overview ==
Incumbent Mayor Isidro Hemedes, Jr. decided not to run for mayor his son, Councilor Ismael Hemedes is running for Mayor under the Nacionalista Party. His opponents were Julio Alcasabas of the Liberal Party, Incumbent Vice Mayor Rommel Gecolea of PDP–Laban and Councilor Jaime Batallones of the United Nationalist Alliance.

Vice Mayor Rommel Gecolea is term-limited, Incumbent Mayor Jun Hemedes Jr. is running in that position, His opponents were councilors Jose Benson "Sonny" Aguillo, son of Proceso and Nila Aguillo and Benjamin Del Rosario.

== Candidates ==
Position		Liberal		UNA		PDP–Laban		Nacionalista	
Mayor		Liberal	Julio Alcasabas	UNA	Jaime Batallones	PDP–Laban	Rommel Gecolea	Nacionalista	Ismael Hemedes
Vice Mayor		Liberal	Jose Benson Aguillo	UNA	Benjamin Del Rosario	PDP–Laban	N/A	Nacionalista	Isidro L. Hemedes, Jr.
Member of the Cabuyao City Council	Lone district	Liberal	Amelito Alimagno; Wanda Alimagno; Alex Angeles; Tutti Caringal; Joey Dinulos^{1}; Danica Gabriel; Nanie Himpisao; Hansel Laviña; Domeng Maniclang; Leif Laiglon Opiña	UNA	Ian Babilonia; Eddie Batallones; Elma Besabe; Jeff Carpena; Alice Catapang; Kenjie Del Rosario; Mario Javier; Olie Lechuga; Marvin Masa; Ron Retaga	PDP–Laban	Imelda Entredicho; Banoy Hain; Kim Hain; Richard Hain; Pondong Hemedez	Nacionalista	Jimbo Alcabasa; Divina Caparas; Patrick Dela Rosa; Tito Delos Santos; Erwin Hemedes; Fe Humarang; Cenon Marcha; Eduardo Ordoñez; Noel Paronda; Neris Santiago

^1 Running as an Independent candidate

== Results ==
=== Mayor ===
Cabuyao mayoral election
Party	Candidate	Votes	%
PDP–Laban	Rommel Gecolea	43,604	34.30
Liberal	Julio Alcasabas	40,082	31.60
Nacionalista	Ismael Hemedes	26,719	21.00
UNA	Jaime Batallones	16,604	13.10
Total votes		127,009	100.00

=== Vice Mayor ===
Cabuyao vice mayoral election
Party	Candidate	Votes	%
Liberal	Jose Benson Aguillo	46,487	38.90
Nacionalista	Isidro Hemedes Jr.	38,448	32.20
UNA	Benjamin Del Rosario	34,454	28.90
Total votes		119,389	100.00

=== Councilors ===
Cabuyao council election
Party	Candidate	Votes	%
Liberal	Leif Laiglon Opiña	61,052	5.94%
Liberal	Wanda Alimagno	59,394	5.78%
Liberal	Tutti Caringal	58,381	5.68%
PDP–Laban	Imelda Entredicho	57,413	5.59%
PDP–Laban	Banoy Hain	55,867	5.44%
PDP–Laban	Kim Hain	53,680	5.23%
PDP–Laban	Richard Hain	48,816	4.75%
Nacionalista	Jimbo Alcabasa	47,597	4.63%
Liberal	Nanie Himpisao	46,776	4.55%
Liberal	Amelito Alimagno	44,705	4.35%
Nacionalista	Fe Humarang	37,827	3.68%
Nacionalista	Neris Santiago	36,924	3.59%
Nacionalista	Patrick Dela Rosa	33,583	3.27%
Nacionalista	Erwin Hemedes	32,473	3.16%
Liberal	Alex Angeles	29,635	2.88%
UNA	Kenjie Del Rosario	28,779	2.80%
UNA	Eddie Batallones	26,183	2.55%
Liberal	Danica Gabriel	26,091	2.54%
PDP–Laban	Pondong Hemedez	23,461	2.28%
Nacionalista	Divina Caparas	21,052	2.05%
Liberal	Domeng Maniclang	20,505	1.99%
Nacionalista	Tito Delos Santos	18,332	1.78%
Nacionalista	Eduardo Ordoñez	17,989	1.75%
Nacionalista	Cenon Marcha	16,741	1.63%
Liberal	Hansel Laviña	16,551	1.61%
Liberal	Joey Dinulos	14,827	1.44%
UNA	Ron Retaga	14,139	1.37%
UNA	Jeff Carpena	12,921	1.25%
UNA	Alice Catapang	11,466	1.11%
UNA	Mario Javier	10,978	1.06%
UNA	Marvin Masa	10,385	1.01%
Nacionalista	Noel Paronda	9,444	0.92%
UNA	Ian Babilonia	8,629	0.84%
UNA	Olie Lechuga	7,405	0.72%
UNA	Elma Besabe	6,327	0.61%
Total votes		1,026,328	100.00
