= 2022 Cabuyao local elections =

Part of Philippine general election

2021 Cabuyao mayoral election
| ← 2019 | May 9, 2022 | 2025 → |
| | Aksyon | IND |
| Nominee | Dennis Felipe Hain | Rommel Gecolea |
| Party | Aksyon | Independent |
| Running mate | Evelyn Del Rosario | Leif Laiglon Opiña |
| Popular vote | 100,987 | 76,062 |
| Percentage | 56.22 | 42.35 |
Mayor before election
Rommel Gecolea
PDP–Laban
Elected mayor
Dennis Felipe Hain
Aksyon

Local elections were held in Cabuyao on May 9, 2022, as part of the 2022 Philippine general election. The voters elected for the elective local posts in the city: the mayor, vice mayor, and ten councilors.

== Overview ==
Incumbent Mayor Rommel Gecolea is seeking his third term with Councilor Leif Laiglon Opiña as his running mate. Their opponent is the tandem of Dennis Felipe Hain and Evelyn Del Rosario of Aksyon Demokratiko.

== Candidates ==
| Position | | Lakas–CMD | | Aksyon Demokratiko | | Independents | |
|---|---|---|---|---|---|---|---|
| Mayor | | Independent | Rommel Gecolea | Aksyon | Dennis Felipe Hain | | |
| Vice Mayor | | Lakas | Leif Laiglon Opiña | Aksyon | Evelyn Del Rosario | | |
| Member of the Cabuyao City Council | Lone district | Lakas | July Alcasabas; Alexis Alimagno; Lester Alimagno; Alexander Angeles; Mike Aranzanso; JC Entredicho; Romy Gardon; Emil Lirio; Cocoy Lopez; William Sigua | Aksyon | Jose Benson Aguillo; Jimbo Alcabasa; Wanda Alimagno; Ariel Bariring; Junjun Batallones; Zhen Sherwin Beguico; Emerson Devoma; Richard Hain; Fe Humarang; Danna Cozette Raymundo | Independent | Christian Aguillo; Dhave Javier; Jhun Lapidario; Elbert Loyola; Mike Suarez |

== Results ==
Here are the official results of the election:

=== Mayor ===
Dennis Hain won.

2022 Cabuyao mayoral election
| Party | Candidate | Votes | % |
|---|---|---|---|
| Aksyon | Dennis Felipe Hain | 100,987 | 56.23 |
| Independent | Rommel Gecolea (Incumbent) | 76,062 | 42.35 |
| PDDS | Jim Nomer Galang | 1,739 | 0.97 |
| Independent | Jonelle Peter Muñoz | 809 | 0.45 |
| Total votes | | 179,597 | 100.00 |
| Aksyon gain from Independent | | | |

=== Vice Mayor ===
Cabuyao vice mayoral election
| Party | Candidate | Votes | % |
|---|---|---|---|
| Lakas | Leif Opiña (Incumbent) | 86,027 | 50.45 |
| Aksyon | Evelyn Del Rosario | 84,502 | 49.55 |
| Total votes | | 170,529 | 100.00 |
| Lakas hold | | | |

=== Councilors ===
Cabuyao City Council election
| Party | Candidate | Votes | % |
|---|---|---|---|
| Aksyon | Junjun Batallones (Incumbent) | 106,283 | 7.11 |
| Aksyon | Richard Hain | 99,259 | 6.64 |
| Aksyon | Jose Benson Aguillo | 95,364 | 6.38 |
| Aksyon | Wanda Alimagno (Incumbent) | 92,998 | 6.22 |
| Aksyon | Jimbo Alcabasa (Incumbent) | 87,522 | 5.85 |
| Aksyon | Ariel Bariring (Incumbent) | 83,651 | 5.59 |
| Aksyon | Danna Cozette Raymundo | 80,434 | 5.38 |
| Aksyon | Emerson Devoma | 79,403 | 5.31 |
| Aksyon | Zhen Sherwin Beguico | 77,669 | 5.20 |
| Aksyon | Fe Humarang (Incumbent) | 68,567 | 4.59 |
| Lakas | Alexis Alimagno | 63,781 | 4.27 |
| Lakas | Alexander Angeles | 61,762 | 4.13 |
| Lakas | Mike Aranzanso | 60,430 | 4.04 |
| Lakas | JC Entredicho (Incumbent) | 60,048 | 4.02 |
| Lakas | Emil Lirio | 57,151 | 3.82 |
| Lakas | July Alcasabas | 52,286 | 3.50 |
| Lakas | Cocoy Lopez (Incumbent) | 50,889 | 3.40 |
| Lakas | Lester Alimagno | 50,713 | 3.39 |
| Lakas | William Sigua | 45,043 | 3.01 |
| Lakas | Romeo Gardon | 31,717 | 2.12 |
| Independent | Christian Aguillo | 28,903 | 1.93 |
| PDP–Laban | Ron Retaga | 16,595 | 1.11 |
| Independent | Dhave Javier | 14,250 | 0.95 |
| Independent | Mike Suarez | 12,016 | 0.80 |
| Independent | Jhun Lapidario | 10,455 | 0.70 |
| Independent | Elbert Loyola | 7,907 | 0.53 |
| Total votes | | 1,495,006 | 100.00% |

| Party | Votes | % | Seats |
|---|---|---|---|
| Aksyon Demokratiko | 871,150 | 58.27 | 10 |
| Lakas–CMD | 533,820 | 35.70 | 0 |
| Independent | 73,531 | 4.92 | 0 |
| Partido Demokratiko Pilipino-Lakas ng Bayan | 16,595 | 1.11 | 0 |
| Total | 1,495,096 | 100.00 | 10 |
