= List of barangays in Cabuyao =

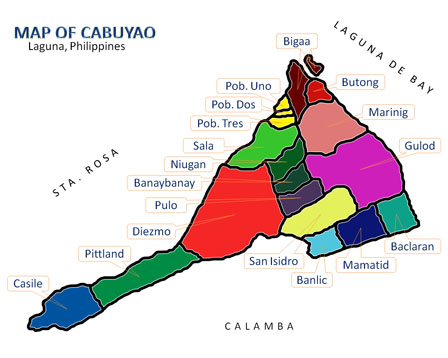
Map of Cabuyao

The City of Cabuyao in the province of Laguna, Philippines is subdivided into eighteen urbanized barangays. Out of which, six of them are located along the National Highway, six on the lakeshore of Laguna de Bay, the country's largest lake, three Poblacion Barangays which was created under the Presidential Decree No. 86 and three on the western part and elevation portion of the city.

The largest barangay in terms of land area is Barangay Gulod, it is popular for being the birthplace and hometown of Charice Pempengco, the country's teen singing sensation. In terms of population, Barangay Mamatid is the most populous barangay of the city, it is the site of Clarmil Manufacturing, Inc., the number one manufacturer of Goldilocks products in whole Southern Luzon.

== Barangays ==
No.	Barangay	Area (in km^{2})	Population (Census 2024)	Population Density (2024)	Barangay Captain (2023-2026)
1	Baclaran	1.74525	14,399	8,300/km^{2}	Oliver P. Galang
2	Banay-Banay	3.10125	25,157	8,100/km^{2}	Eric E. Barron
3	Banlic	2.3	20,549	8,900/km^{2}	Elizabeth L. Austria
4	Bigaa	2.091	12,018	5,800/km^{2}	Rose Anne V. Cantalejo
5	Butong	1.62	14,505	9,000/km^{2}	Charie P. Barrio
6	Casile	3.18	4,661	1,500/km^{2}	Orlando P. de Sagun
7	Diezmo	1.59	6,495	4,100/km^{2}	Alfredo M. Malabanan
8	Gulod	4.087	21,643	5,300/km^{2}	Dominador V. Maniclang
9	Mamatid	2.6	56,237	22,000/km^{2}	Ernani G. Himpisao
10	Marinig	3.915	63,301	16,000/km^{2}	Conrado B. Hain Jr.
11	Niugan	3.52027	26,980	7,700/km^{2}	John Cyril C. Hain
12	Pittland	2.91	5,486	1,900/km^{2}	Teodoro N. Enriquez
13	Pulo	3.0	41,837	14,000/km^{2}	Armando H. Amoranto
14	Sala	1.546	14,841	9,600/km^{2}	Francisco D. Alimagno
15	San Isidro	3.14585	26,022	8,300/km^{2}	Richard L. Algire
16	Barangay I Poblacion	0.23017	4,621	20,000/km^{2}	Raymonte D Bienes
17	Barangay II Poblacion	0.23333	3,324	14,000/km^{2}	Melvin R. Calandria
18	Barangay III Poblacion	0.2365	2,216	9,400/km^{2}	Antonette M. Hain

=== Barangay location ===
Cabuyao is composed of eighteen (18) urbanized barangays, in which six of them are located along the National Highway, six on the lakeshore of Laguna de Bay, the country's largest lake, three Poblacion Barangays which was created under the Presidential Decree No. 86 and three on the western part and elevation portion of the town.

=== Sangguniang Barangay ng Banlic, City of Cabuyao ===
Position	Name	Term	Committee
Punongbarangay	Elizabeth "Liza" Laodinio Austria	2023-Present	Sangguniang Barangay ng Banlic
Kagawad	Adinos Lignay	2023-Present	Livelihood, Labor and Employment
Kagawad	Randy "Andoy" Pesito Punzalan	2023-Present	Education, Tourism and Culture
Kagawad	Gregorio "Gorio" Capacio	2018-Present	Peace and Order
Kagawad	Georgina "Gina" De Mesa Inventor	2023-Present	Health and Social Welfare, Cleanliness and Beautification
Kagawad	Romualdo Ruiz "RR" Gecolea	2023-Present	Agriculture, Solid Waste Management
Kagawad	Jake Pasilan	2023-Present	Trade and Industry, Environmental Protection
Kagawad	Noeminda Noemi Almario	2016-Present	Public Works and Infrastracture, Women and Family
Secretary	Annabelle M. Alcantara	2002-Present	Sangguniang Barangay ng Banlic
Treasurer	Enrique Rosal	2010-Present	Sangguniang Barangay ng Banlic
Admin	Phillip Maurice L. Austria	2023-Present	Sangguniang Barangay ng Banlic

=== Former Barangays ===
Year	Name	Description
1571–1742	Barangay Calamba	Calamba became an independent pueblo on August 28, 1742. With the passage of Republic Act No. 9024 on April 7, 2001, it was promoted from a municipality into Laguna's second component city after San Pablo City.
1571–1688	Barangay Malabanan	Biñan separated from its mother town Tabuco (now Cabuyao) in 1688 and became a town. In 2010, it was proclaimed as the fourth component city of Laguna.
1571–1725	Barangay San Pedro Tunasan	Barrio San Pedro became a separate town on January 18, 1725. And Tunasan is now a barangay of Muntinlupa.
1571–1792	Barangay Santa Rosa de Lima	On the year after barrio Biñan became a separated town from Tabuco, Barrio Bukol (Santa Rosa, before separation from Biñan) separated from Cabuyao and became a town on January 15, 1792. It is now one of the four first class cities of the province of Laguna.
1571–1678	Barangay Santo Tomas	In 1678, Santo Tomas became a town in the neighbor province of Batangas.

== See also ==
- Barangay
- Cabuyao, Laguna
- Mamatid, Cabuyao
