= Charo Ronquillo =

Filipino fashion model (born 1990)

- Born: Charo Ronquillo; April 22, 1990 (age 36); Cabuyao, Laguna, Philippines
- Modeling information
- Height: 5 ft 10 in (1.78 m)
- Hair color: Black
- Eye color: Black
- Agency: Ford Models (New York, Chicago); Francina Models (Barcelona)

Charo Ronquillo (born April 22, 1990, in Cabuyao, Laguna, Philippines) is a Filipino fashion model. She was described by Bill Ford as, "that unique look from the Philippines".

== Early life ==
Ronquillo was first discovered by a modeling agency while playing basketball at an arcade at a mall in the Philippines. Before entering high school she ticked off, “short hair, ugly teeth, tomboyish and always picking a fight,” as her main traits. Only when she started paying attention to her looks did modeling become an interest. Ronquillo first entered the MTV Fashionista program with the hopes of advancing her career, but ultimately did not win.

At 17 years old, Ronquillo joined and won the Ford Supermodel of the World Philippines 2005 Search. She went on to represent the Philippines at the Supermodel World Finals 2006 in New York City, placing third out of 39 contestants. This earned her $100,000 and a three-year contract with Ford Models. Ronquillo debuted in fashion shows in New York in February 2006, ultimately deciding to move to the United States the next year.

== Modeling career ==
Since her win, Ronquillo appeared on the catwalks of New York Fashion Week, modeling for labels and designers including Lacoste, Lela Rose, Nanette Lapore, Zero Maria Cornejo, Tory Burch, Antonio Berardi, Kenneth Cole, Mac Cosmetics Barbie Collection, Zaldy for L.A.M.B. by Gwen Stefani, BCBG, Sisley and Benetton New York fashion Week F/W 2009-2010 for Elie Tahari and Paris Fashion Week Haute Couture FW 2011-2012 for Julien Fournié and Eric Tibusch. She was one of Chloe Dao's models on the finale of Project Runway season 2. She also appeared on numerous fashion and beauty editorials for Spanish Vogue, Indian Vogue, Teen Vogue, Marie Claire Paris and US, ELLE Vietnam, Cosmopolitan US and Glamour. She has appeared in advertisements for Old Navy, Macy's, and Sak's Fifth Avenue.

== Agencies ==
- Faze Model Management, Inc.
- Calcarrie's International Models Philippines
- Ford Models New York
- Angels and Demons Model Management, Paris France
- Franicina Models Barcelona, Spain
- D1 Models London
- New Madison Paris
