= Jun Hemedes Jr. =

Filipino politician

The Honorable Isidro L. Hemedes Jr.

23rd Mayor of Cabuyao
- In office June 30, 2007 – June 30, 2016
- Vice Mayor: Benjamin del Rosario; Rommel Gecolea
- Preceded by: Nila Aguillo
- Succeeded by: Rommel Gecolea

Vice Mayor of Cabuyao
- In office June 30, 2001 – June 30, 2007
- Preceded by: Rico Alimagno
- Succeeded by: Benjamin del Rosario

Member of the Cabuyao Municipal Council
- In office June 30, 1998 – June 30, 2001

Personal details
- Born: Isidro Lebrilla Hemedes Jr. October 5, 1958 (age 67) Sala, Cabuyao, Laguna
- Party: Independent (2018–present)
- Other political affiliations: Nacionalista (2009–2018); Lakas–Kampi–CMD (2008–2009); KAMPI (2007–2008); Lakas–CMD (until 2007)
- Spouse: Mariel Hemedes
- Children: 3
- Parent: Isidro Hemedes Sr.
- Education: Far Eastern University (BCom)
- Occupation: Politician, businessman

Isidro Lebrilla Hemedes Jr. (born October 5, 1958) is a Filipino politician who served as the mayor of Cabuyao from 2007 until 2016. He previously served as a municipal councilor of Cabuyao from 1998 to 2001, and municipal vice-mayor from 2001 to 2007.

== Background ==
Isidro Lebrilla Hemedes Jr. or commonly known as "Jun Hemedes" is a native of Cabuyao, Laguna. He studied in Elementary at the Cabuyao Elementary School from 1964 to 1970, had his highschool at Cabuyao Institute from 1970 to 1974. During college, he was a working student, he earned bachelor's degree in Commerce major in Accounting at Far Eastern University.

Jun Hemedes was a businessman before entering politics. He is married to Mariel Martinez; they have three children, namely: Ismael M. Hemedes, Marielisse M. Hemedes and Rowell "Nonie" M. Hemedes. He is currently the Board Director of Luzon Development Bank, Board of Regents and Chairman of the Local School Board of Pamantasan ng Cabuyao.

== Political career ==
Jun Hemedes was exposed to politics with the influence of his brother Leopoldo "Pol" Hemedes who served as municipal vice-mayor of Cabuyao for several years. He served as municipal councilor from 1998 to 2001 and then became municipal vice-mayor from 2001 to 2007 in which he served as President of the Vice Mayor's League of Laguna and Regional Board Director of the Vice Mayor's League of Calabarzon (Region IV-A) from 2004 to 2007. He became the Municipal Mayor from 2007 to 2012, and with his leadership, he became the first city mayor of Cabuyao after it has been converted into a city on August 4, 2012.

Hemedes ran for representative of Laguna's 2nd district in 2019 but lost to Board Member Ruth Mariano-Hernandez.

=== Graft Case ===
On February 7, 2019, Hemedes has been found by the Sandiganbayan guilty of graft for being a member of the board of directors of Luzon Development Bank, a private bank, during his term in government office. He was allegedly held the position between June 30, 2007 to February 5, 2014, and thus violated Section 1 of Presidential Decree No. 119. Also, the Sandiganbayan perpetually barring him from holding public office.

Political offices
Preceded by First	Mayor of Cabuyao; 2012–2015	Succeeded by Incumbent
Preceded by Nila G. Aguillo	Mayor of Cabuyao, Laguna; 2007–2012	Succeeded by Last
Preceded by Rico Alimagno	Vice Mayor of Cabuyao, Laguna; 2001–2007	Succeeded by Benjamin C. del Rosario
