= 2019 Cabuyao local elections =

Local elections in the Philippines

2019 Cabuyao mayoral election
- May 13, 2019
	PDPLBN	NP
Nominee	Rommel Gecolea	Dennis Felipe Hain
Party	PDP–Laban	Nacionalista
Running mate	Leif Laiglon Opiña	Jose Benson Aguillo
Popular vote	98,340	45,790
Percentage	68.23	31.77
Mayor before election
Rommel Gecolea
PDP–Laban
Elected mayor
Rommel Gecolea
PDP–Laban

Local elections were held in Cabuyao on May 13, 2019, as part of the 2019 Philippine general election. The voters elected for the elective local posts in the city: the mayor, vice mayor, and ten councilors.

== Overview ==
Incumbent Mayor Rommel Gecolea is seeking his second term under PDP–Laban with Councilor Leif Laiglon Opiña as his running mate. Their opponent is the tandem of Dennis Felipe Hain and Vice Mayor Jose Benson Aguillo of Nacionalista Party.

== Candidates ==
Position		PDP–Laban		Nacionalista Party		Independents	
Mayor		PDP–Laban	Rommel Gecolea	Nacionalista	Dennis Felipe Hain		
Vice Mayor		PDP–Laban	Leif Laiglon Opiña	Nacionalista	Jose Benson Aguillo		
Member of the Cabuyao City Council	Lone district	PDP–Laban	Ting Alimagno; Mike Aranzanso; Ariel Bariring; Boyet Bella; Benjie Del Rosario; JC Entredicho; Fe Humarang; Cocoy Lopez; William Sigua	Nacionalista	Jimbo Alcabasa; Wanda Alimagno; Junjun Batallones; Tutti Caringal; Banoy Hain; Kim Hain; Richard Hain; Nani Himpisao; Danna Cozette Raymundo	Independent	Alexander Angeles; Roderick Cardema; Jun Lapidario

== Results ==
Here are the official results of the election:

=== Mayor ===
2019 Cabuyao mayoral election
Party	Candidate	Votes	%
PDP–Laban	Rommel Gecolea	98,340	68.23
Nacionalista	Dennis Felipe Hain	45,790	31.77
Total votes		144,130	100.00
PDP–Laban hold			

=== Vice Mayor ===
2019 Cabuyao vice mayoral election
Party	Candidate	Votes	%
PDP–Laban	Leif Laiglon Opiña	87,950	63.15
Nacionalista	Jose Benson Aguillo	51,321	36.85
Total votes		139,271	100.00
PDP–Laban gain from Nacionalista			

=== Councilors ===
Party	Votes	%	Seats
PDP–Laban	580,689	49.60	6
Nacionalista Party	515,539	44.03	4
Independent	74,591	6.37	0
Total	1,170,819	100.00	10

Cabuyao council election
Party	Candidate	Votes	%
PDP–Laban	Benjie Del Rosario	89,230	7.62%
PDP–Laban	Ting Alimagno (Incumbent)	84,366	7.20%
Nacionalista	Junjun Batallones	75,099	6.41%
PDP–Laban	Fe Humarang	72,515	6.19%
PDP–Laban	JC Entredicho	67,702	5.78%
PDP–Laban	Ariel Bariring	63,418	5.41%
Nacionalista	Wanda Alimagno (Incumbent)	63,389	5.41%
Nacionalista	Tutti Caringal (Incumbent)	62,884	5.37%
PDP–Laban	Cocoy Lopez	62,803	5.36%
Nacionalista	Jimbo Alcabasa (Incumbent)	59,050	5.04%
Nacionalista	Richard Hain (Incumbent)	55,623	4.75%
Independent	Alexander Angeles	55,332	4.72%
Nacionalista	Banoy Hain (Incumbent)	55,021	4.69%
Nacionalista	Nani Himpisao (Incumbent)	54,206	4.62%
PDP–Laban	Mike Aranzanso	52,156	4.54%
PDP–Laban	William Sigua	47,902	4.09%
Nacionalista	Kim Hain (Incumbent)	47,741	4.07%
Nacionalista	Danna Cozette Raymundo	42,526	3.63%
PDP–Laban	Boyet Bella	40,597	3.46%
Independent	Jun Lapidario	12,380	1.05%
Independent	Roderick Cardema	6,879	0.58%
Total votes		1,170,819	100.00%
