= Cabuyao City Council =

Legislative body of the city of Cabuyao, Philippines

Cabuyao City Council Sangguniang Panlungsod ng Kabuyaw

Type
- Type: Unicameral
- Term limits: 3 terms (9 years)

Leadership
- Presiding Officer: Jaime Onofre D. Battallones, National Unity Party (Philippines)

Structure
- Seats: 12 councilors (including 2 ex officio members); 1 ex officio presiding officer
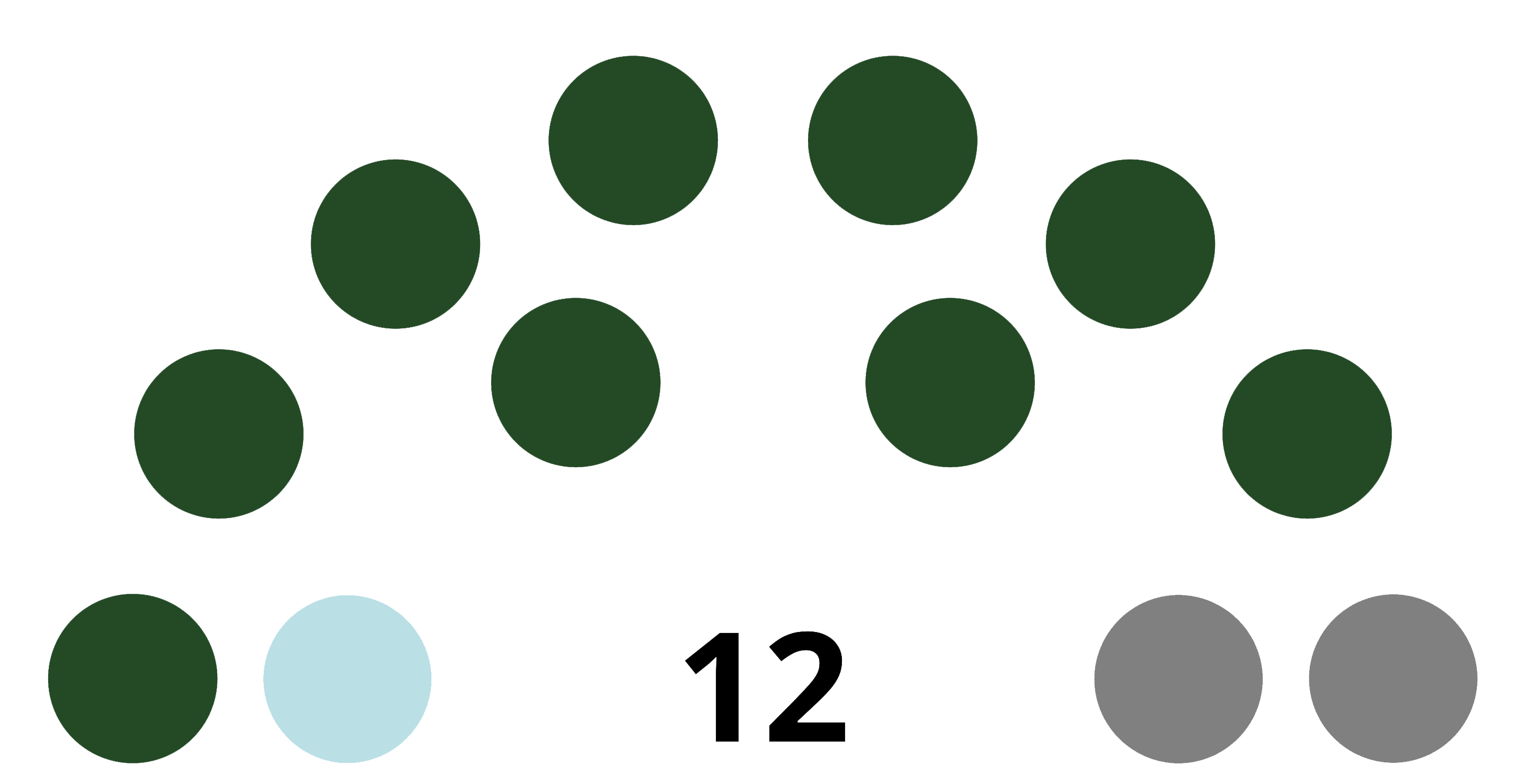
- Political groups: NUP (9); Lakas (1)
- Length of term: 3 years
- Authority: Cabuyao City Charter; Local Government Code of the Philippines

Elections
- Voting system: Plurality-at-large voting
- Last election: May 12, 2025
- Next election: May 15, 2028

Meeting place
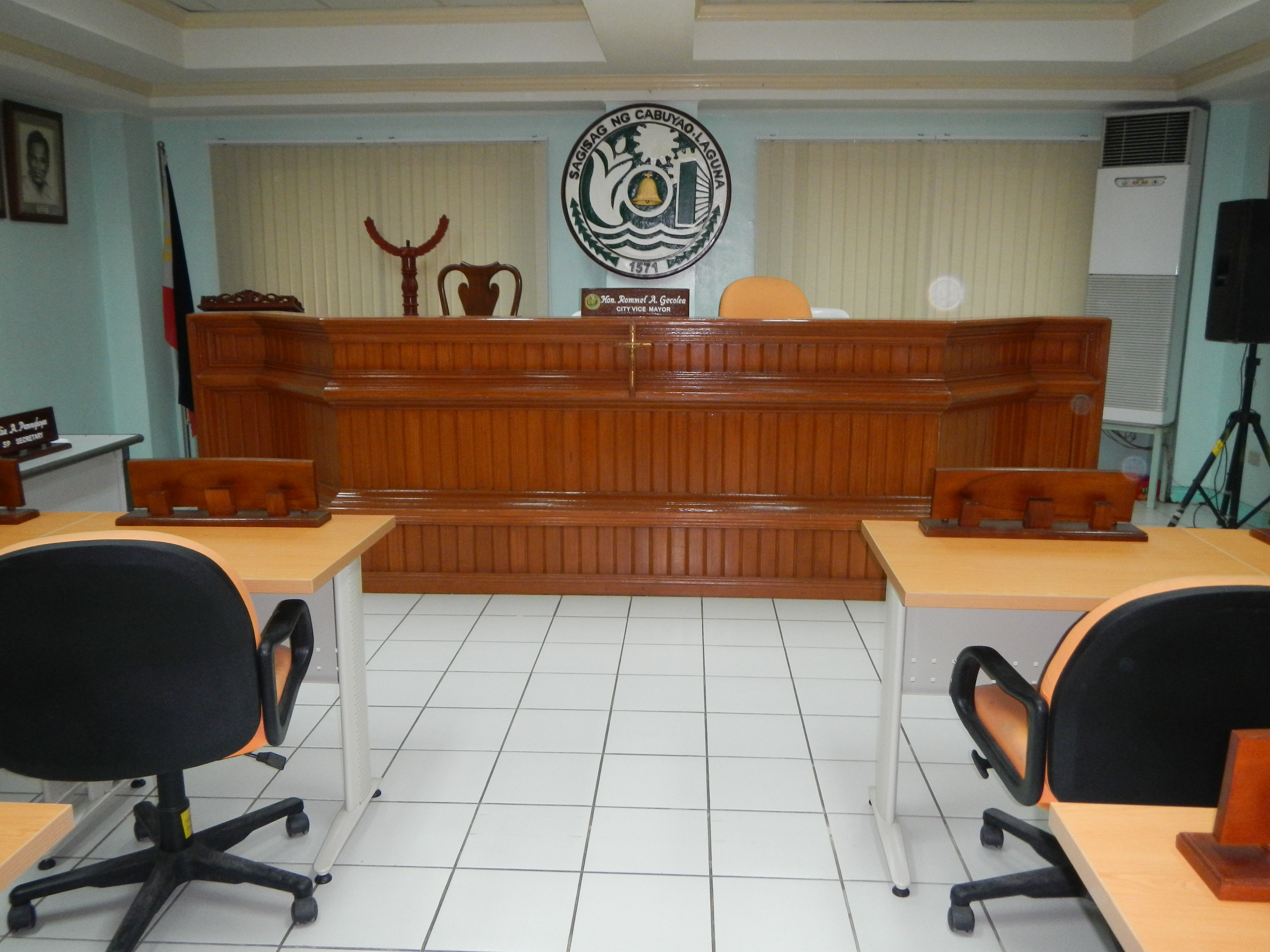
- Session Hall of the Cabuyao City Hall

Website
- Official Website of the City of Cabuyao

The Cabuyao City Council (Filipino: Sangguniang Panlungsod ng Kabuyaw) is Cabuyao's Sangguniang Panlungsod or legislative body. The council has twelve members which is composed of ten councilors, one ex officio member elected from the ranks of barangay (neighborhood) chairmen and one presiding officer. The vice-mayor of the city is the presiding officer of the council, who is elected citywide.

The council is responsible for creating laws and ordinances under the city's jurisdiction. The mayor can veto proposed bills, but the council can override it with a two-thirds supermajority.

The council meets at the Session Hall of the Cabuyao City Hall for their regular sessions.

== Membership ==
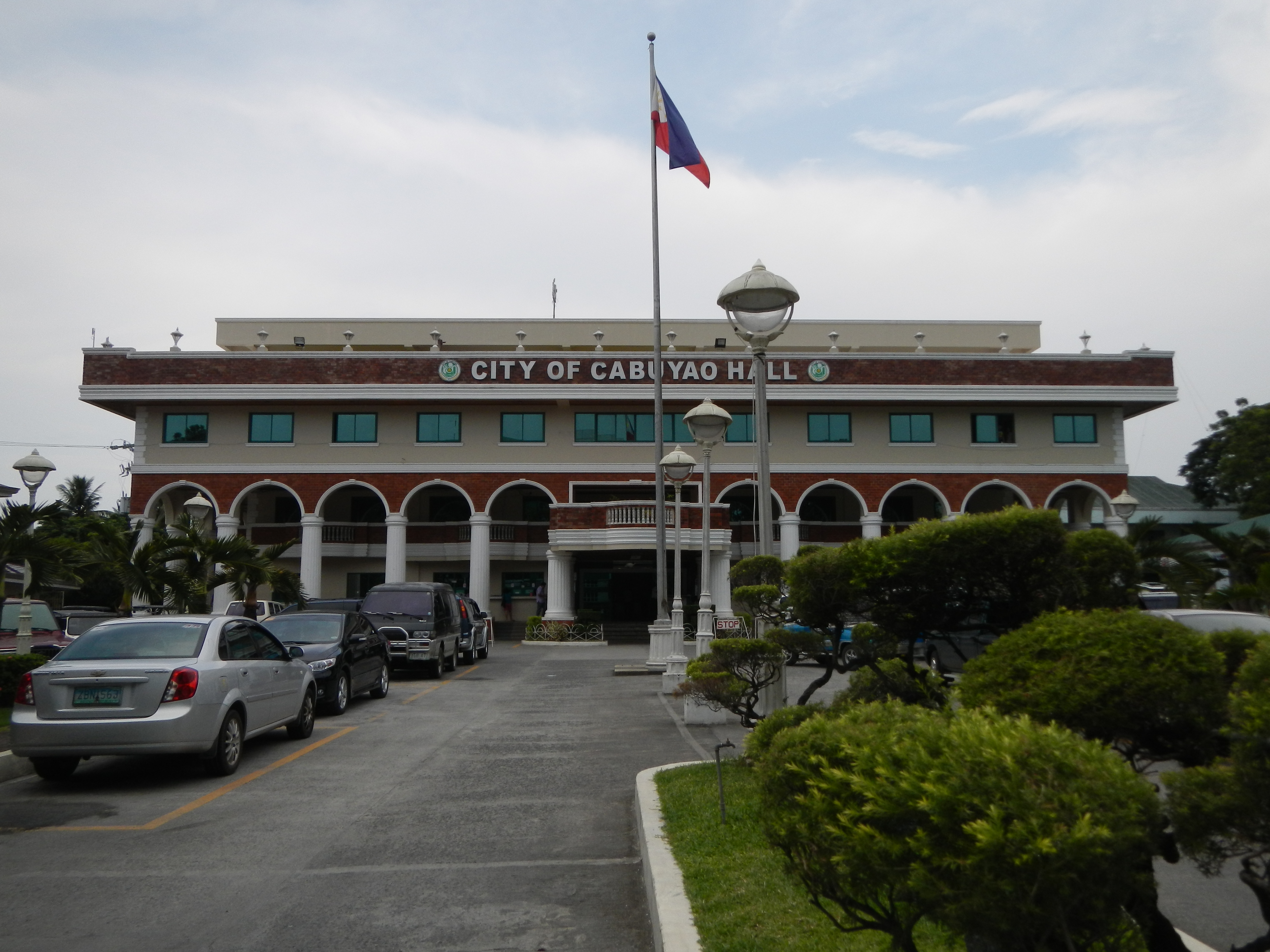
The session hall is located inside the Cabuyao City Hall in Barangay Sala

Each of Cabuyao's ten city councilors were elected at large by the voters of the city. In addition, the barangay chairmen and the SK chairmen throughout the city elect amongst themselves their representatives to the council. Hence, there are 12 councilors.

City council elections are synchronized with other elections in the country. Elections are held every first Monday of May every third year since 1992.

=== Current members ===
As the presiding officer, Vice Mayor Jaime Onofre D. Batallones (NUP) can only vote to break ties.

The parties as stated in the 2025 elections.

Position	Name	Party
Presiding Officer	Jaime Onofre D. Batallones	NUP
City; Councilors	Jose Benson G. Aguillo	NUP
City; Councilors	Ariel C. Bariring II	NUP
City; Councilors	Alexis A. Alimagno	Lakas
City; Councilors	Evelyn G. Del Rosario	NUP
City; Councilors	Kim M. Hain	NUP
City; Councilors	Sherwin D. Beguico	NUP
City; Councilors	Rico Mauro G. Alimagno	NUP
City; Councilors	Jose Miguel J. Alcabasa	NUP
City; Councilors	Emerson L. Devoma	NUP
City; Councilors	Maria Fe P. Humarang	NUP
Ex Officio City Council Member

== Past members ==
=== 2022–2025 membership ===
Position	Name	Party
Presiding Officer	Leif Laiglon A. Opiña	Lakas
City; Councilors	Jaime Onofre D. Battallones	Aksyon
City; Councilors	Richard C. Hain	Aksyon
City; Councilors	Jose Benson G. Aguillo	Aksyon
City; Councilors	Maria Wanda C. Alimagno	Aksyon
City; Councilors	Jose G. Alcabasa	Aksyon
City; Councilors	Gabriel C. Bariring II	Aksyon
City; Councilors	Danna Cozette L. Raymundo	Aksyon
City; Councilors	Emerson L. Devoma	Aksyon
City; Councilors	Sherwin D. Beguico	Aksyon
City; Councilors	Ma. Fe P. Humarang	Aksyon
Ex Officio City Council Member

=== 2019–2022 membership ===
Position	Name	Party
Presiding Officer	Leif Laiglon A. Opiña	PDP–Laban
City; Councilors	Benjamin C. del Rosario	PDP–Laban
City; Councilors	Amelito G. Alimagno	PDP–Laban
City; Councilors	Jaime Onofre R. Batallones	Nacionalista
City; Councilors	Ma. Fe P. Humarang	PDP–Laban
City; Councilors	Jan Christian A. Entredicho	PDP–Laban
City; Councilors	Gabriel C. Bariring II	PDP–Laban
City; Councilors	Maria Wanda C. Alimagno	Nacionalista
City; Councilors	Tito Fortunato A. Caringal II	Nacionalista
City; Councilors	Francis Angelo A. Lopez	PDP–Laban
City; Councilors	Jose G. Alcabasa, Jr.	Nacionalista
Ex Officio City Council Member

=== 2016–2019 membership ===
Position	Name	Party
Presiding Officer	Jose Benson G. Aguillo	Liberal
City; Councilors	Leif Laiglon A. Opiña	Liberal
City; Councilors	Maria Wanda C. Alimagno	Liberal
City; Councilors	Tito Fortunato A. Caringal II	Liberal
City; Councilors	Imelda A. Entredicho	PDP–Laban
City; Councilors	Severiano B. Hain	PDP–Laban
City; Councilors	Kim M. Hain	PDP–Laban
City; Councilors	Richard C. Hain	PDP–Laban
City; Councilors	Jose G. Alcabasa, Jr.	Nacionalista
City; Councilors	Hernani G. Himpisao	Liberal
City; Councilors	Amelito G. Alimagno	Nacionalista

=== 2013–2016 membership ===
This is the first composition of Cabuyao's Sangguniang Panlungsod (city council) since its conversion into a city in 2012.

Position	Name	Party
Presiding Officer	Rommel A. Gecolea	Nacionalista
City; Councilors	Jaime Onofre R. Batallones	Liberal
City; Councilors	Ismael M. Hemedes	Nacionalista
City; Councilors	Leif Laiglon A. Opiña	Liberal
City; Councilors	Richard C. Hain	Nacionalista
City; Councilors	Tito Fortunato A. Caringal	Liberal
City; Councilors	Apolinario B. Hain	Nacionalista
City; Councilors	Benjamin C. del Rosario	Liberal
City; Councilors	Jose Benson G. Aguillo	Liberal
City; Councilors	Imelda A. Entredicho	Nacionalista
City; Councilors	Amelito G. Alimagno	Liberal
Ex Officio City Council Member
ABC President	Severiano B. Hain (Niugan)	Nonpartisan
SKFed President	Jervis R. Himpisao (Mamatid)	Nonpartisan

=== 2010-2013 membership ===
This is the final composition as Cabuyao's Sangguniang Bayan (municipal council) as, in 2012, voters approved the ratification of Republic Act No 10163 or the "Charter of the City of Cabuyao," effectively transitioning into a Sangguniang Panlungsod set-up by the 2013 elections.

Position	Name	Party
Presiding Officer	Rommel A. Gecolea	Nacionalista
Sangguniang; Bayan; Members	Maria Wanda C. Alimagno	Aksyon
Sangguniang; Bayan; Members	Ismael M. Hemedes	Nacionalista
Sangguniang; Bayan; Members	Christian G. Aguillo	Liberal
Sangguniang; Bayan; Members	Apolinario B. Hain	Nacionalista
Sangguniang; Bayan; Members	Leif Laiglon A. Opiña	Aksyon
Sangguniang; Bayan; Members	Imelda A. Entredicho	Nacionalista
Sangguniang; Bayan; Members	Jose G. Alcabasa, Jr.	Nacionalista
Sangguniang; Bayan; Members	Ricky A. Voluntad	Liberal

=== 2007-2010 membership ===
Position	Name	Party
Presiding Officer	Benjamin C. del Rosario	Lakas
Sangguniang; Bayan; Members	Maria Wanda C. Alimagno	UNO
Sangguniang; Bayan; Members	Jose M. Laviña	Lakas
Sangguniang; Bayan; Members	Rommel A. Gecolea	KAMPI
Sangguniang; Bayan; Members	Jose Benson G. Aguillo	Lakas
Sangguniang; Bayan; Members	Apolinario B. Hain	KAMPI
Sangguniang; Bayan; Members	Jose G. Alcabasa, Jr.	Lakas
Sangguniang; Bayan; Members	Lope J. Diamante, Jr.	Lakas
Sangguniang; Bayan; Members	Ernani J. Delfinado	Independent

=== 2004–2007 membership ===
Position	Name	Party
Presiding Officer	Isidro L. Hemedes, Jr.	Lakas
Sangguniang; Bayan; Members	Leif Laiglon A. Opiña	Independent
Sangguniang; Bayan; Members	Jose Benson G. Aguillo	Lakas
Sangguniang; Bayan; Members	Jose M. Laviña	Lakas
Sangguniang; Bayan; Members	Ernani J. Delfinado	Lakas
Sangguniang; Bayan; Members	Lope J. Diamante, Jr.	Lakas
Sangguniang; Bayan; Members	Maria Wanda C. Alimagno	KNP/PDP-Laban
Sangguniang; Bayan; Members	Luzviminda Alcabasa	Lakas
Sangguniang; Bayan; Members	Rommel A. Gecolea	KNP/PDP-Laban

=== 2001–2004 membership ===
Position	Name	Party
Presiding Officer	Isidro L. Hemedes, Jr.	KAMPI
Sangguniang; Bayan; Members	Jose Benson G. Aguillo	KAMPI
Sangguniang; Bayan; Members	Jose G. Alcabasa, Jr.	KAMPI
Sangguniang; Bayan; Members	Lope J. Diamante, Jr.	KAMPI
Sangguniang; Bayan; Members	Ernani J. Delfinado	KAMPI
Sangguniang; Bayan; Members	Jose M. Laviña	KAMPI
Sangguniang; Bayan; Members	Philip R. Rodriguez	KAMPI
Sangguniang; Bayan; Members	Rommel A. Gecolea	Lakas
Sangguniang; Bayan; Members	Eduardo M. Alviar	KAMPI

== Standing Committees ==
There is a total of twenty seven (27) standing committees in the city council. Each committee is headed and co-headed by a member of the city council.

Committee	Chairperson	Co-Chairperson
Committee on Finance, Budget and Appropriation	TBD	TBD
Committee on Women and Family	TBD	TBD
Committee on Human Rights	TBD	TBD
Committee on Youth	TBD	TBD
Committee on Environmental Protection	TBD	TBD
Committee on Cooperatives	TBD	TBD
Committee on Rules and Privileges	TBD	TBD
Committee on Ordinances and Legal Matters	TBD	TBD
Committee on Peace and Order and Public Safety	TBD	TBD
Committee on Transportation and Communications	TBD	TBD
Committee on Health and Demography	TBD	TBD
Committee on Agriculture	TBD	TBD
Committee on Technical and Tertiary Education	TBD	TBD
Committee on Secondary Education	TBD	TBD
Committee on Pre-school and Elementary Education	TBD	TBD
Committee on Good Government, Public Ethics and Accountability	TBD	TBD
Committee on Market and Slaughterhouse	TBD	TBD
Committee on Games and Amusement	TBD	TBD
Committee on Trade, Commerce and Industry	TBD	TBD
Committee on Public Works	TBD	TBD
Committee on Housing and Urban Planning	TBD	TBD
Committee on Barangay Affairs	TBD	TBD
Committee on Social Welfare	TBD	TBD
Committee on Human Resources Development, Labor and Employment	TBD	TBD
Committee on Tourism	TBD	TBD
Committee on Sports	TBD	TBD
Committee on People Empowerment and Accreditation	TBD	TBD

== Prominent councilors ==
- Dennis Felipe "DenHa" Hain, city mayor
- Leif Laiglon A. Opiña, vice mayor
- Benjamin C. del Rosario, former vice mayor
- Tutti Caringal, 6 Cycle Mind lead vocalist

== See also ==
- Cabuyao
- Mayors of Cabuyao
