= Nila Aguillo =

Filipino politician

22nd Mayor of Cabuyao, Laguna
- In office June 30, 2004 – June 30, 2007
- Vice Mayor: Isidro Hemedes Jr.
- Preceded by: Proceso Aguillo
- Succeeded by: Isidro Hemedes Jr.

Personal details
- Born: Nila Garcia; February 20, 1949 Cabuyao, Laguna, Philippines
- Died: November 27, 2022 (aged 73) Cabuyao, Laguna, Philippines
- Party: Liberal Party
- Spouse: Proceso D. Aguillo
- Relations: husband
- Children: Jose Benson, Christian

Nila Garcia Aguillo (February 20, 1949 - November 27, 2022) was a Filipino politician and the first female Mayor that served as the mayor of Cabuyao from 2004 until 2007. She was the wife of former Mayor Proceso D. Aguillo, who served from 1995 to 2004.

== Political career ==
Aguillo successfully ran for mayor of Cabuyao in 2004 as her husband was term-limited. It was during her term when former President Gloria Macapagal Arroyo opened Southville Housing project for poor families displaced from the railway tracks to make way for the SouthRail project. It is a 53.337-hectare (131.80-acre) resettlement site in Barangays Marinig, Niugan and Banay-Banay for families displaced by the PNR Northrail-Southrail Linkage project from the rail tracks in Cabuyao and Makati.

Numerous development projects were accomplished during her three-year term as the first lady mayor of the town. She was instrumental in the construction of school buildings, multi-purpose halls, barangay halls and health centers. She also gave priority on the improvement of the Town Plaza and the only state university of the town, the Pamantasan ng Cabuyao.

However, she decided not to seek reelection in 2007. Her husband instead ran again for mayor but was defeated by incumbent vice mayor Isidro Hemedes Jr.

== Election protest ==
After losing in 2010 mayoral election, Aguillo together with her vice-mayoral bet Benjamin C. del Rosario filed a petition to Commission on Elections, Isidro Hemedes Jr. and Rommel A. Gecolea declaring for an election protest.

The Court said they failed to establish the alleged fraudulent and irregular acts during voting, counting of votes, and canvassing of results in the May 2010 elections and their petition was dismissed.

Prior to seeking relief with the High Court, Aguillo and del Rosario lost in an en banc decision of the Commission on Elections (Comelec) and in the Laguna Regional Trial Court on June 21, 2010.

Political offices
| Preceded by Proceso D. Aguillo | Mayor of Cabuyao; 2004-2007 | Succeeded by Isidro L. Hemedes Jr. |
