= Sangguniang Panlungsod =

City legislature in Philippine cities

The Sangguniang Panlungsod (SP) is the local legislative body of a city government in the Philippines. It is commonly referred to in English as a city council, while its members are generally called councilors. In Filipino, the members are known as kagawad; in predominantly Visayan-speaking cities, the terms konsehal (masculine) and konsehala (feminine), or the shortened sehal, are also used. The name Sangguniang Panlungsod is derived from the Filipino words sanggunian ("council") and lungsod ("city"). The former derives from sangguni ("to consult"), while lungsod is ultimately of Visayan origin, where it refers to a town or municipality.

The Local Government Code of 1991 governs the composition, powers, and functions of the Sangguniang Panlungsod. Its members are either elected or serve in an ex officio capacity. The city's vice mayor serves as the presiding officer of the Sangguniang Panlungsod.

The Sangguniang Panlungsod operates under the mayor–council government system, specifically the strong mayor variant.

== Powers, duties, and functions ==
The Sangguniang Panlungsod, as the legislative body of the city, is mandated by the Local Government Code of 1991 to:

- Approve ordinances and resolutions;
- Generate and maximize the use of resources and revenues for the development plans, program objectives, and priorities of the city;
- Enact ordinances granting franchises and authorizing the issuance of permits or licenses, subject to the provisions of Book II of the Local Government Code of 1991;
- Regulate activities relative to the use of land, buildings, and structures within the city;
- Approve ordinances that ensure the efficient and effective delivery of the basic services and facilities provided for under Section 17 of the Local Government Code; and
- Exercise such other powers and perform such other duties and functions as may be prescribed by law or ordinance.

== Composition ==
=== Presiding officer ===
The city vice mayor serves as the presiding officer of the Sangguniang Panlungsod. The vice mayor does not have voting privileges except to cast a vote in the event of a tie. In the absence of the vice mayor, a temporary presiding officer is elected by the members of the Sangguniang Panlungsod from among themselves.

=== Regular members ===
The number of elected councilors to which a city's Sangguniang Panlungsod is entitled is determined by law. In some cases, the number of regular members and the delineation of Sangguniang Panlungsod districts are provided for in the city's charter, such as in Sorsogon City, or in a separate act of Congress, such as in Bacoor.

In the absence of such provisions, Republic Acts Nos. 6636 and 7166 provide for a default composition of ten elected members for a city's Sangguniang Panlungsod, elected at large. The exceptions are:

- If a Metro Manila city comprises a lone legislative district, the Commission on Elections divides the city into two Sangguniang Panlungsod districts, each electing six members, for a total of 12;
- If a Metro Manila city is divided into two or more legislative districts, each district elects six members, unless otherwise provided by the city's charter or another statute, as in Makati, Marikina, Muntinlupa, Parañaque, and Taguig;
- If a city outside Metro Manila comprises a lone legislative district, it elects 12 members as a single at-large district; and
- If a city outside Metro Manila is divided into two or more legislative districts, each district elects eight members.

Among the cities, Manila and Quezon City have the most elected councilors, with 36 each, followed by Davao City and Taguig with 24 each, and Caloocan with 18.

Total	District (as of 2025)							Cities
Total	At-large	1st	2nd	3rd	4th	5th	6th	Cities
36		6	6	6	6	6	6	Manila (Council); Quezon City (Council)
24		8	8	8				Davao City (Council)
24		12	12					Taguig (Council)
18		6	6	6				Caloocan (Council)
16		8	8					Antipolo (Council); Cagayan de Oro (Council); Cebu City (Council); Makati (Council); Marikina (Council); Muntinlupa (Council); Parañaque (Council); Zamboanga City (Council)
12		4	4	4				Samal (Council); Sorsogon City (Council)
12		6	6					Bacoor (Council); Calbayog (Council); Las Piñas (Council); Malabon (Council); Mandaluyong (Council); Navotas (Council); Pasay (Council); Pasig (Council); San Jose del Monte (Council); San Juan (Council); Valenzuela (Council)
12	12							Baguio (Council); Bacolod (Council); Batangas City (Council); Biñan (Council); Butuan (Council); Calamba (Council); Dasmariñas (Council); General Santos (Council); General Trias (Council); Iligan (Council); Iloilo City (Council); Imus (Council); Lapu-Lapu (Council); Lipa (Council); Mandaue (Council); San Pedro (Council); San Fernando, La Union (Council); Santa Rosa (Council); Tuguegarao (Council)
10	10							Alaminos (Council); Angeles City (Council); Bago (Council); Bais (Council); Balanga (Council); Baliwag (Council); Batac (Council); Bayawan (Council); Baybay (Council); Bayugan (Council); Bislig (Council); Bogo (Council); Borongan (Council); Cabadbaran (Council); Cabanatuan (Council); Cabuyao (Council); Cadiz (Council); Calaca (Council); Calapan (Council); Candon (Council); Canlaon (Council); Carcar (Council); Carmona (Council); Catbalogan (Council); Cauayan (Council); Cavite City (Council); Cotabato City (Council); Dagupan (Council); Danao (Council); Dapitan (Council); Digos (Council); Dipolog (Council); Dumaguete (Council); El Salvador (Council); Escalante (Council); Gapan (Council); Gingoog (Council); Guihulngan (Council); Himamaylan (Council); Ilagan (Council); Iriga (Council); Isabela (Council); Kabankalan (Council); Kidapawan (Council); Koronadal (Council); La Carlota (Council); Lamitan (Council); Laoag (Council); Ligao (Council); Legazpi (Council); Lucena (Council); Maasin (Council); Mabalacat (Council); Malaybalay (Council); Malolos (Council); Marawi (Council); Masbate (Council); Mati (Council); Meycauayan (Council); Muñoz (Council); Naga, Camarines Sur (Council); Naga, Cebu (Council); Olongapo (Council); Ormoc (Council); Oroquieta (Council); Ozamiz (Council); Pagadian (Council); Palayan (Council); Panabo (Council); Passi (Council); Puerto Princesa (Council); Roxas (Council); Sagay (Council); San Carlos, Negros Occidental (Council); San Carlos, Pangasinan (Council); San Fernando, Pampanga (Council); San Jose (Council); San Pablo (Council); Santiago (Council); Santo Tomas (Council); Silay (Council); Sipalay (Council); Surigao City (Council); Tabaco (Council); Tabuk (Council); Tacloban (Council); Tacurong (Council); Tagaytay (Council); Tagbilaran (Council); Tagum (Council); Talisay, Cebu (Council); Talisay, Negros Occidental (Council); Tandag (Council); Tanauan (Council); Tangub (Council); Tanjay (Council); Tarlac City (Council); Tayabas (Council); Toledo (Council); Trece Martires (Council); Urdaneta (Council); Valencia (Council); Victorias (Council); Vigan (Council)

=== Other members ===
Similar to the Sangguniang Panlalawigan in the provinces or Sangguniang Bayan in the municipalities, the Local Government Code of 1991 also allocates a Sangguniang Panlungsod seat each to the city chairpersons of the Liga ng mga Barangay (League of Barangays), Pederasyon ng mga Sangguniang Kabataan (Federation of Youth Councils), and other sectoral representatives as determined locally relevant, such as the Indigenous Peoples Mandatory Representative.
