= University of Cabuyao =

Public university in Laguna, Philippines

- Pamantasan ng Cabuyao
- Motto: Kapayapaan, Kaunlaran, Paglilingkod (Peace, Prosperity, Service)
- Type: Locally-funded university
- Established: April 16, 2003
- Academic affiliations: ALCUCOA; PICAB; PTC
- Chairperson: Hon. Dennis Felipe C. Hain
- President: Dr. Roberto F. Rañola Jr.
- Location: Banay-Banay, Cabuyao, Laguna, Philippines; 14°15′34″N 121°08′01″E
- Campus: Urban
- Hymn: PnC Dangal ng Cabuyao (PnC March)
- Colors
- Website: pnc.edu.ph
- Location in Laguna Location in Luzon Location in the Philippines

The Pamantasan ng Cabuyao (PnC; also known as the University of Cabuyao) is a university in the city of Cabuyao, province of Laguna, Philippines. It was founded by then Mayor Proceso “Etok” D. Aguillo, through the enactment of Municipal Ordinance 2003-059 approved on April 16, 2003.

Before the establishment of the Pamantasan ng Cabuyao, there was a satellite campus of the Laguna State Polytechnic University (LSPU) at the Cabuyao National High School. The LSPU was operating through a memorandum of agreement between the LSPU president and Cabuyao municipal mayor, which commenced in 1993 and ended on March 31, 2003.

== History ==
Pamantasan ng Cabuyao Main Building

In late 2002, there was a strong protest against the leadership of the LSPC president from faculty members, students of LSPC, and some students from LSPC - CABUYAO. Many people from Cabuyao protested.

The protest was supported by almost all students, most of whom were Cabuyeños. It resulted to the issuance of the Notice of Termination to the memorandum of agreement. The administration of the mayor was left with no option but to establish Cabuyao Community College.

Having anticipated the closure of LSPC-Cabuyao, faculty members assisted the office of the mayor and informed them that the Pamantasan ng Lungsod ng Maynila (PLM) is the model school for local college. Benjamin Tayabas, then PLM president, assisted Cabuyao municipality and personally attended to the work of putting up a university. He suggested that Pamantasan ng Cabuyao should be the name. On April 15, 2003 the Sanguniang Bayan enacted Municipal Ordinance No. 2003-059. The same was approved a day after by Mayor Proceso “Etok” D. Aguillo.

Pamantasan ng Cabuyao was inaugurated on July 31, 2003, the birthday of its founding mayor, and it was personally inaugurated President Gloria Macapagal Arroyo on June 19, 2003 on the occasion of the 107th birthday of Dr. Jose Rizal.

During the term of Mayor Isidro L. Hemedes, Jr. and the able assistance of Atty. Rommel Gecolea, whom succeeded him afterward by winning the 2016 elections, education reforms have been introduced and new systems have been put in place.

== Academic programs ==
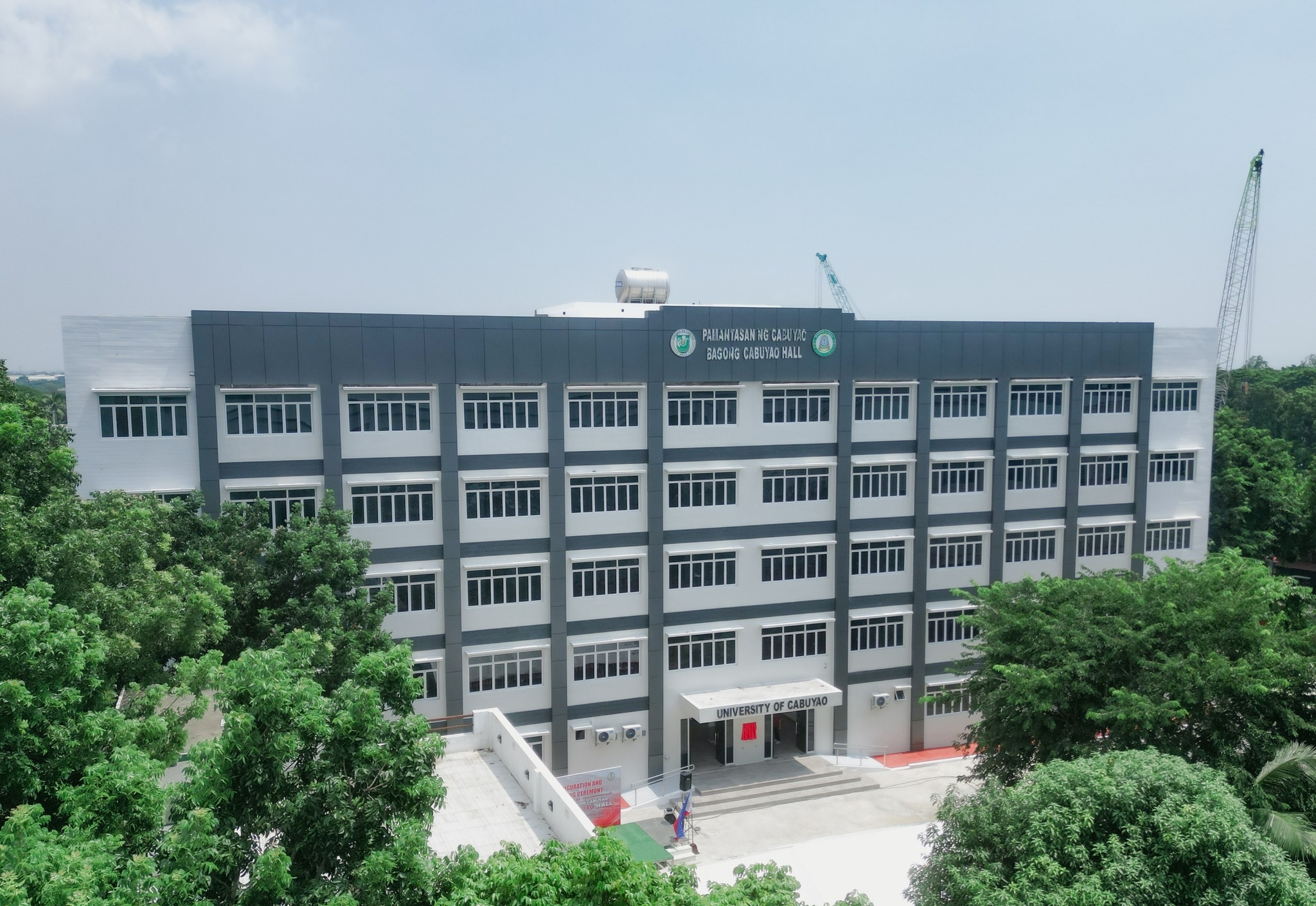
PnC Bagong Cabuyao Hall

List of courses and degree programs that Pamantasan ng Cabuyao offers to students.

=== College of Arts and Sciences ===
- Bachelor of Science in Psychology

=== College of Business, Accountancy and Administration ===
- Bachelor of Science in Accountancy
- Bachelor of Science in Business Administration
  - Major in Financial Management
  - Major in Marketing Management

=== College of Computing Studies ===
- Bachelor of Science in Computer Science
- Bachelor of Science in Information Technology

=== College of Education ===
- Bachelor of Elementary Education
- Bachelor of Secondary Education
  - Major in English
  - Major in Filipino
  - Major in Mathematics
  - Major in Social Sciences

=== College of Engineering ===
- Bachelor of Science in Computer Engineering
- Bachelor of Science in Electronics Engineering
- Bachelor of Science in Industrial Engineering

=== College of Health and Allied Sciences ===
- Bachelor of Science in Nursing

=== Graduate School ===
- Master of Arts in Education
  - Major in Administration and Supervision
- Master of Arts in Psychology
- Master in Business Administration

== Previously offered programs ==
=== Baccalaureate programs ===
- Bachelor of Arts in Communication
- Bachelor of Arts in Linguistics
- Bachelor of Arts in Psychology
- Bachelor of Science in Biology
- Bachelor of Science in Medical Technology
- Bachelor of Science in Pharmacy
- Bachelor of Science in Physical Therapy
- Bachelor of Science in Radiologic Technology
- Bachelor of Science in Sociology

=== Graduate School ===
- Master in Business Administration (non-thesis)
- Master of Science in Mathematics

=== Technical and vocational education ===
- Computer Hardware (Computer Technology)
- Caregiving
- PC Operations
- Computer Programming
- Consumer Electronics
- Refrigeration and Air-Conditioning
- Cookery (Culinary Arts)
- Automotive

== See also ==
- Banay-Banay, Cabuyao
- Local Colleges and Universities
- Association of Local Colleges and Universities
- Pamantasan
- Alculympics
