= Cabuyao =

Component city in Laguna, Philippines

- Component city
- City of Cabuyao
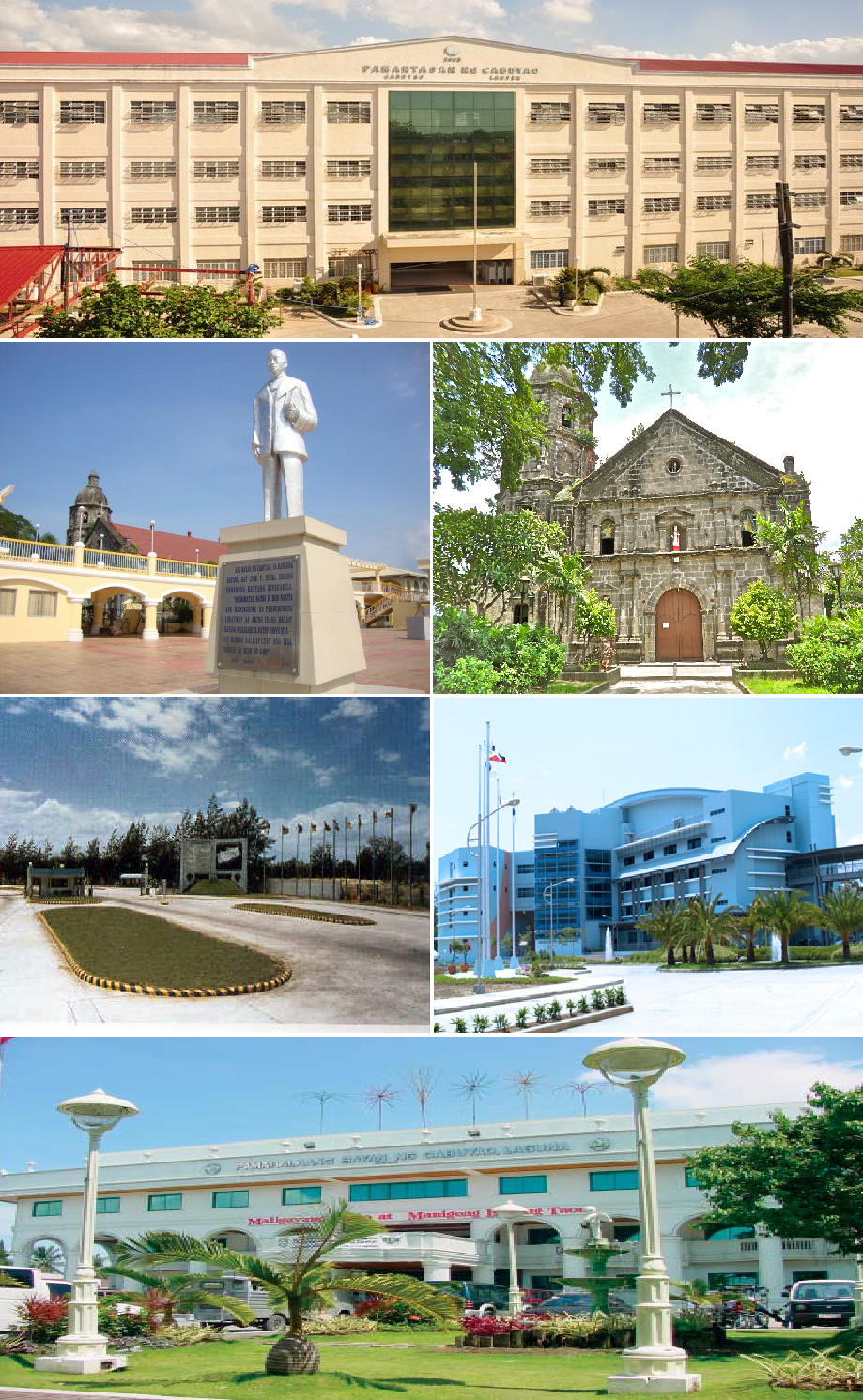
- (from top, left to right): University of Cabuyao, City Plaza, Church of Saint Polycarp, Light Industry & Science Park of the Philippines I, Mapúa Malayan Colleges Laguna, City Hall

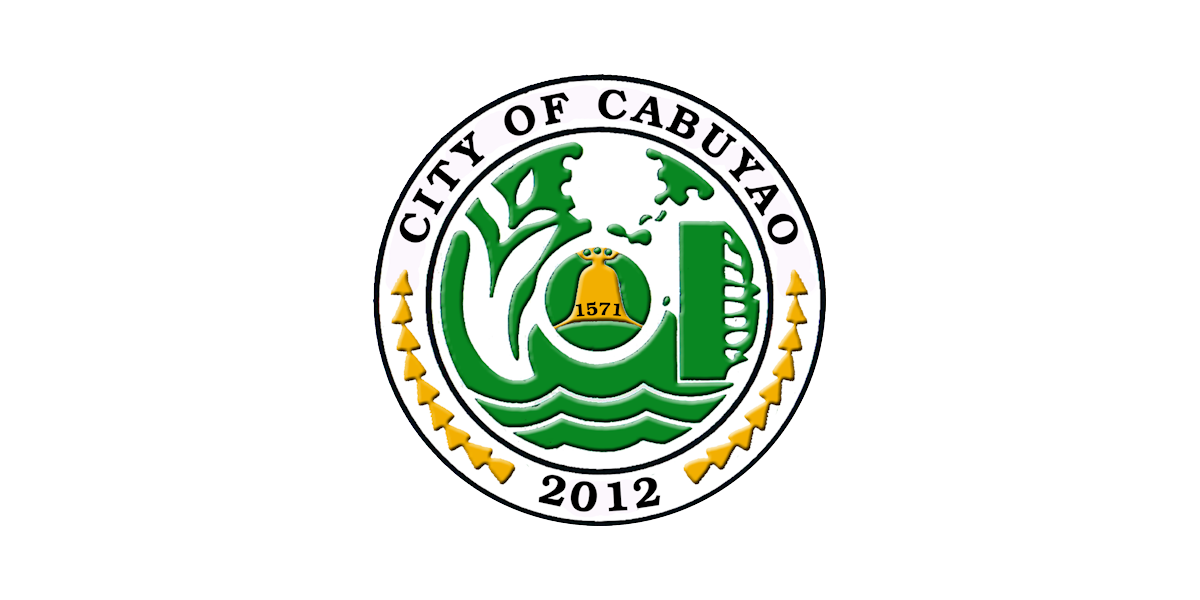
- Flag
- Etymology: Citrus macroptera
- Nicknames: "The City of Modern Factories"; "The Enterprise City of the Philippines"; "Next Wave City"; "The Home of the Legendary Kampanang Ginto"; "Golden Bell City"; formerly: "The Richest Municipality of the Philippines"
- Motto: One Cabuyao, One Vision (Isang Kabuyaw, Isang Pananaw) Bagong Cabuyao (New Kabuyaw)
- Anthem: Cabuyao Hymn
- Map of Laguna with Cabuyao highlighted
- Interactive map of Cabuyao
- Location within the Philippines
- Coordinates: 14°16′30″N 121°07′30″E
- Country: Philippines
- Region: Calabarzon
- Province: Laguna
- District: 2nd district
- Founded: January 16, 1571
- Cityhood: August 4, 2012
- Barangays: 18 (see Barangays)

Government
  - Type: Sangguniang Panlungsod
  - Mayor: Dennis Felipe C. Hain (NUP )
  - Vice Mayor: Jaime Onofre D. Batallones (NUP)
  - Representative: Ramil L. Hernandez (Lakas–CMD)
  - City Council: Members: Jose Benson G. Aguillo; Gabriel C. Bariring II; Maria Alexis A. Alimagno; Evelyn G. Del Rosario; Kim M. Hain; Sherwin D. Beguico; Jose Miguel J. Alcabasa; Rico Mauro G. Alimagno; Emerson L. Devoma; Maria Fe P. Humarang
  - Electorate: 229,652 voters (2025)

Area
  - Total: 43.40 km^{2} (16.76 sq mi)
- Elevation: 99 m (325 ft)
- Highest elevation: 1,094 m (3,589 ft)
- Lowest elevation: 2 m (6.6 ft)

Population (2024 census)
  - Total: 365,202
  - Density: 8,415/km^{2} (21,790/sq mi)
  - Households: 100,875
- Demonym(s): Cabuyeños (male); Cabuyeñas (female)

Economy
  - Income class: 1st city income class
  - Poverty incidence: 4.38% (2023)
  - Revenue: ₱ 2,979 million (2024)
  - Assets: ₱ 7,118 million (2024)
  - Expenditure: ₱ 2,039 million (2024)
  - Liabilities: ₱ 1,944 million (2024)

Service provider
  - Electricity: Manila Electric Company (Meralco)
  - Water: Cabuyao Water District (CABWAD)
- Time zone: UTC+8 (PST)
- ZIP code: 4025
- PSGC: 043404000
- IDD : area code: +63 (0)49
- Native languages: Tagalog
- Patron saint: Saint Polycarp
- Website: www.cabuyao.gov.ph

Cabuyao (Tagalog: [kɐˈbujaʊ]), officially the City of Cabuyao (Filipino: Lungsod ng Cabuyao), is a component city in the province of Laguna, Philippines. According to the 2025 census, it has a population of 365,202 people.

It used to be known as the "richest municipality in the Philippines" due to the large populace of migrants working in the town's industrial estates. Companies such as Nestlé Philippines, Asia Brewery, Inc., San Miguel Corporation, Tanduay Distillers, Inc., Wyeth Philippines, Inc., Procter & Gamble Philippines, Light Industry and Science Park of the Philippines and Mapúa Malayan Colleges Laguna have established factories or are located in Cabuyao.

By virtue of Republic Act No. 10163, the municipality of Cabuyao was converted to a component city after the ratification of a plebiscite held on August 4, 2012.

== Etymology ==
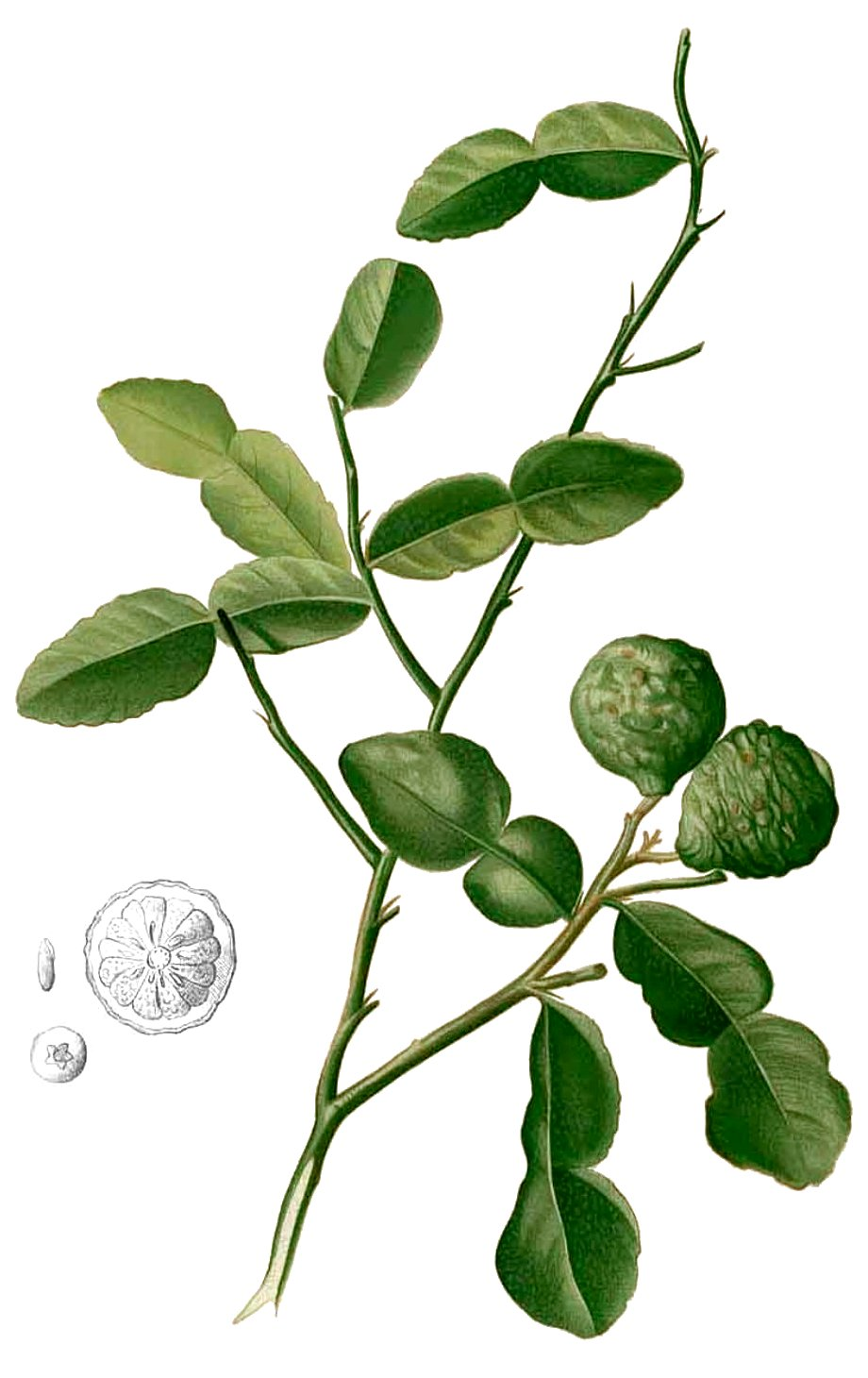
Citrus hystrix, locally known as kabuyaw, the source of the name of the city

Cabuyao was once the central part of Tabuco, a large territory that included the modern-day cities of San Pedro, Biñan, Santa Rosa, and Calamba. The name "Cabuyao" came from the kabuyaw tree, Citrus hystrix.

The town of Tabuco was located near the junction of a river and the lake of Ba-i where bancas (rafts) were the common means of transportation. Many kabuyaw trees grew in the area, and their fruit was used as shampoo. When the priest asked for the name of the place, the local women answered "kabuyaw", believing that the priest was asking for the name of the trees growing around the wharf. From then on, the priests and Spanish officials referred to the town as Cabuyao.

== History ==
=== Precolonial era ===
One of the biggest villages established in the western portion of the lake was "Tabuko" or "Hangganang Ilog" which means boundary in the native language. Tabuko had no definite boundary except for natural landmarks such as the mountain, hills and the lake. The boundary of Tabuko reached the mountain range of Sungay on the west, Mount Makiling on the south, the lake of Ba-i on the east, and the large track of quicksand at Tunasan on the north.

=== Spanish era ===
In the summer of 1896, news spread over Cabuyao that the province of Cavite had revolted against the Spanish government. Anticipating the disorder it would bring to the community, Lt. Isabelo Virtucio organized a volunteer group to fight against the Spanish government. He coordinated with the different leaders of the revolutionary groups, and his group joined the forces of General Paciano Rizal, the brother of the Philippine national hero, José Rizal. The group adopted guerrilla warfare in fighting the Spaniards, ambushing and putting up traps on the roads used by their enemy. It took almost two years before the Spanish armed forces surrendered in 1898.

=== American era ===
The next elected mayor of Cabuyao was Nicolas Limcaoco, who served from 1937 to 1940. The original 3-year term was amended by the constitution, which made the new term of the elected mayor four years. His accomplishments included the construction of a road from Poblacion to Marinig, which shortened the travel time going to the different barangays along the coastal area of the town, and the installation of a water line from Matang Tubig at Casile to Poblacion. The project was completed in 1938 under the supervision of Jose L. Acuña who was elected as Mayor in 1941.

=== Japanese occupation ===
In Cabuyao, there was no direct military confrontation between the Japanese soldiers and Filipinos. Confrontation did occur between the Makapili, a pro-Japanese group, and the guerrillas. The known guerrilla leaders of Cabuyao were Col. Nicolas Soriano, Maj. Amado Garcia, Maj. Romulo Alcasabas, Maj. Raymundo Tanchico, Maj. Placido Aragon and Capt. Pablo Garcia.

=== Liberation period ===
On the morning of September 21, 1944, the people of Cabuyao were surprised to hear the sound of American airplanes flying to Manila for bombing operations. On January 1, 1941, the American forces, part of the 7th Army Corps under Gen. Krueger, arrived at Cabuyao. The first group of American soldiers were led by Capt. Brown, who made their camp at the church compound (Patio).

Before the arrival of joint American and Philippine Commonwealth army soldiers to Cabuyao, the town was under the control of the guerrilla forces under the leadership of Col. Nicolas Soriano. Thus, no military encounter occurred. The Americans readily established a provisionary government called the Philippine Civil Affairs Unit (PCAU) where Enrique Hemedes was appointed as head. The office was responsible for the distribution of food and clothing to the needy people of Cabuyao but with priority to the evacuees coming from nearby towns.

After the arrival of the local Filipino troops of the 4th, 42nd and 47th Infantry Division of the Philippine Commonwealth Army and 4th Constabulary Regiment of the Philippine Constabulary, Cabuyao was taken from the town municipalities and aided by the local guerrillas and the U.S. troops against the Japanese.

Emilio Tanchico replaced Hemedes. Tanchico was responsible for restoring the operations of the municipal government of Cabuyao, such as the Office of the Treasurer, Office of Police, Postal Office and Communication and other offices. Nicolas Limcaoco then replaced him in the middle of 1946 and served until 1947.

The first thing Limcaoco did was to establish peace and order in the locality. There were many loose firearms because of the recent war, which led to robberies, theft, killing and other criminal offenses. He hired 10 "terong" (toughies) coming from the mountainous areas of Cabuyao and appointed them as policemen. Criminality was lessened and peace and order was maintained during that time in Cabuyao.

=== Post World War II ===
When the Philippines gained its independence on July 4, 1946, a presidential election preceded it where President Manuel Roxas was elected as the first president of the Third Republic. The president appointed Jose L. Acuña as mayor of Cabuyao.

Acuña restored the organizational set up of the Municipal Government of Cabuyao. He assisted the war veterans of Cabuyao in receiving their back pay, those whose properties were destroyed during the war in receiving war damage, and freed from jail people mistaken as Makapili or collaborators.

In the 1947 local election, Lope B. Diamante was elected as mayor. Mauro H. Alimagno served for three terms: 1952–55, 1956–59 and 1960–63. Antonio Bailon served as mayor during the term 1964–67.

Alimagno again served during the period 1968–71, 1972–79 and 1980. However, he failed to complete his last term as mayor in 1980 as he was gunned down in Calamba. Vice Mayor Nicanor Alcasabas succeeded as mayor and served the remaining term. After the EDSA Revolution, Isidro T. Hildawa was appointed mayor of Cabuyao. However, he was later appointed as member of the Provincial Board of Laguna, so it was Constancio G. Alimagno, Jr. who was appointed as mayor on April 1, 1986.

Proceso Aguillo was elected mayor of Cabuyao in the 1988 local election. Constancio G. Alimagno, Jr. served as mayor in 1992–95. Proceso Aguillo served as mayor from 1995 to 2004. Nila G. Aguillo, wife of Proceso Aguillo, assumed office until 2007. Isidro Hemedes, Jr. a relative of Enrique Hemedes, ascended into office from 2007 to 2016.

=== Cityhood ===
On December 6, 2010 Laguna 2nd District Representative Timmy Chipeco filed House Bill No. 03811, or an Act Converting the Municipality of Cabuyao into a Component City of the Province of Laguna. The bill was referred to the Committee on Local Government dated December 13, 2010, and substituted to House Bill No. 4259. The Municipal Mayor as well as the residents of the town fully supported the measure and they looked forward to Cabuyao becoming a city since it was fully deserving and qualified. After the successful readings and committee hearings of the bill, both in the House of Congress and Senate, the bill was approved by the senate on January 16, 2012, the same date as Cabuyao's 441st founding anniversary.

On May 16, 2012, President Benigno Aquino III approved House Bill No. 4259 or the Cabuyao City Charter and signed into law by virtue of Republic Act No. 10163. On August 4, 2012, a plebiscite was held to ratify the conversion of the town into a city. A total of 24,670 Cabuyeños took part; 22,132 voters or 89.71% of the total number of voters voted "Yes" while the remaining 2,538 or 10.29% voted "No". The City of Cabuyao is the 142nd city in the Philippines and 5th component city in Laguna besides San Pablo, Calamba, Santa Rosa and Biñan.

== Geography ==
Cabuyao is located 42 kilometers (26 mi) southeast of Metro Manila, at the western portion of Laguna. It is bordered by Santa Rosa City to the north, Laguna de Bay, the country's largest lake, to the east; Calamba to the south, and Silang, Cavite to the east. Cabuyao is 45 kilometers (28 mi) away from Santa Cruz, the provincial capital, and 8 kilometers (5.0 mi) from the city center of Calamba, the chartered city and regional center of Calabarzon region.

The only lake found in Cabuyao is Laguna de Bay. Barangays situated along the lake are Bigaa, Butong, Marinig, Gulod, Baclaran and Mamatid. Types of fish found in the lake are kanduli, biya, talapia, ayungin, hito, karpa, mamale, bangus, dalag, papalo, kakasuhet and dulong. The Cabuyao Fishing Port can be found on barangay Marinig where many Cabuyeños and Cabuyeñas undertake zumba every Saturday and Sunday at sunrise.

Cabuyao has the following rivers:

- Cabuyao River – Between the boundary of Santa Rosa and Cabuyao.
- Marinig River – Between the boundary of barangays Bigaa and Marinig. The river is connected from Niugan-Sala River and flows directed to Laguna de Bay.
- Niugan-Sala River – The river flows along the boundary of the barangays Niugan and Sala.
- Tiway-Tiway River – a river of the city, flowing towards Laguna de Bay.
- San Cristobal River – Between the boundary of Calamba and Cabuyao.

The ricefields or ricelands in Cabuyao are found in barangay Bigaa, Butong, Marinig, Gulod, Baclaran, Mamatid, San Isidro, Pulo, Banay-Banay, Niugan and Sala. As of 2004, the total area of riceland is 940.56 hectares (9.4056 in square kilometers) and 468 farmers as per data of the City Agriculture Office.

Narra Trees are planted along the Poblacion-Marinig Road and besides the compound of the City Hall of Cabuyao. Agricultural crops are palay, squash, garlic, watermelon, pineapple, coffee and other fruit bearing plants.

=== Barangays ===
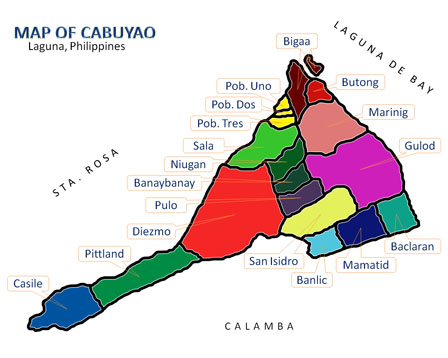
Map of Cabuyao

Cabuyao is politically divided into 18 barangays - as indicated in the matrix below - which are all classified as urban. Each barangay consists of puroks and some have sitios.

No.	Barangay	Population (2024)	Land Area (km^{2})	Land Area (hectares)
1	Baclaran	14,399	1.74525	174.5
2	Banay-Banay	25,157	3.10125	310.1
3	Banlic	20,549	2.3	230
4	Bigaa	12,018	2.091	209.1
5	Butong	14,505	1.62	162
6	Casile	4,661	3.18	318
7	Diezmo	6,495	1.59	159
8	Gulod	2,1643	4.087	408.7
9	Mamatid	56,237	2.6	260
10	Marinig	64,301	3.915	391.5
11	Niugan	26,899	3.52027	352
12	Pittland	5,486	2.91	291
13	Pulo	41,837	3.0	300
14	Sala	14,841	1.546	154.6
15	San Isidro	26,022	3.14585	314.6
16	Barangay I Poblacion	4,621	0.23017	23
17	Barangay II Poblacion	3,324	0.23333	23.3
18	Barangay III Poblacion	2,216	0.2365	23.7

=== Climate ===
Climate data for Cabuyao, Laguna
Month	Jan	Feb	Mar	Apr	May	Jun	Jul	Aug	Sep	Oct	Nov	Dec	Year
Mean daily maximum °C (°F)	29 (84)	30 (86)	32 (90)	34 (93)	32 (90)	31 (88)	29 (84)	29 (84)	29 (84)	30 (86)	30 (86)	29 (84)	30 (87)
Mean daily minimum °C (°F)	21 (70)	20 (68)	21 (70)	22 (72)	24 (75)	24 (75)	24 (75)	24 (75)	24 (75)	23 (73)	22 (72)	21 (70)	23 (73)
Average precipitation mm (inches)	10 (0.4)	10 (0.4)	12 (0.5)	27 (1.1)	94 (3.7)	153 (6.0)	206 (8.1)	190 (7.5)	179 (7.0)	120 (4.7)	54 (2.1)	39 (1.5)	1,094 (43)
Average rainy days	5.2	4.5	6.4	9.2	19.7	24.3	26.9	25.7	24.4	21.0	12.9	9.1	189.3
Source: Meteoblue

== Demographics ==
=== Population ===
Population census of Cabuyao
Year	Pop.	±% p.a.
1903	6,439	—
1918	8,536	+1.90%
1939	11,660	+1.50%
1948	15,206	+2.99%
1960	20,618	+2.57%
1970	32,117	+4.53%
1975	36,505	+2.60%
1980	46,286	+4.86%
1990	66,975	+3.76%
1995	77,302	+2.72%
2000	106,630	+7.14%
2007	205,376	+9.46%
2010	248,436	+7.17%
2015	308,745	+4.23%
2020	355,330	+3.00%
2024	365,202	+0.66%
Source: Philippine Statistics Authority

In the 2024 census, Cabuyao had a population of 365,202 people. Thus, the city surpassed San Pedro, making it the 4th largest local government unit and city of Laguna. The city has a population density of 8,200 people/km^{2} (21,000 people/mi^{2}).

The total number of households in Cabuyao as of 2020 is 100,875. The city has an Average Annual Growth Rate (AAGR) of +4.3% in the past 10 years (from 2010 to 2020).

No.	Barangay	Rank	Population (2010)	Population (2020)	Population Density (2020)	No. of Households (2020)	Average Annual Growth Rate (Population)
1	Baclaran	9th	12,192	14,606	8,369/km^{2}	3,697	▲1.98%
2	Banay-Banay	4th	21,934	34,260	11,047/km^{2}	10,495	▲5.62%
3	Banlic	7th	12,675	20,646	8,977/km^{2}	6,785	▲6.29%
4	Bigaa	10th	10,051	13,665	6,535/km^{2}	3,879	▲3.6%
5	Butong	8th	12,360	14,764	9,114/km^{2}	3,725	▲1.94%
6	Casile	16th	2,128	3,619	1,138/km^{2}	1,020	▲7.0%
7	Diezmo	15th	2,681	6,622	4,165/km^{2}	1,972	▲14.7%
8	Gulod	11th	9,417	17,215	4,212/km^{2}	4,545	▲8.28%
9	Mamatid	1st	50,213	61,085	23,494/km^{2}	15,515	▲2.17%
10	Marinig	2nd	37,169	45,343	11,582/km^{2}	12,156	▲2.2%
11	Niugan	3rd	26,807	38,576	10,958/km^{2}	12,178	▲4.4%
12	Pittland	18th	1,740	6,052	2,080/km^{2}	1,920	▲24.8%
13	Pulo	6th	15,124	35,113	11,704/km^{2}	10,524	▲13.22%
14	Sala	12th	8,275	10,903	7,052/km^{2}	3,134	▲3.18%
15	San Isidro	5th	18,145	23,324	7,414/km^{2}	6,322	▲2.85%
16	Barangay I Poblacion	14th	2,839	3,690	16,032/km^{2}	1,165	▲3.0%
17	Barangay II Poblacion	17th	1,840	1,573	6,742/km^{2}	486	▼-1.45%
18	Barangay III Poblacion	13th	2,846	4,274	18,072/km^{2}	1,357	▲5.02%
-	TOTAL	-	248,436	355,330	8,200/km^{2}	100,875	▲4.3%

=== Religion ===
Diocesan Shrine of San Vicente Ferrer, Mamatid

Cabuyao is predominantly Christian of whom 93% are Roman Catholics, while the Members Church of God International claims 2%, and the Iglesia ni Cristo 3% of the Cabuyao populace. Evangelical churches are growing, including the prominent evangelical multi-site church, Victory Church Cabuyao and Jesus Is Lord Church (JIL). Other religious groups/sectors with smaller membership include the Methodists, Buddhists, Lutherans, Jesus Is Lord Church, Jehovah's Witnesses, Bible Baptist, Four Square Gospel, and the Lamp Christian Fellowship Church.

=== Religious sites ===
The St. Polycarp Parish, in barangay Uno, was built in 1763. To this day Cabuyao is the only place in the Philippines where St. Polycarp is the patron saint.

A second church was constructed in Cabuyao after the first church situated in Marinig was destroyed by flood and tidal waves. The records of the church are intact from the 18th century to the present.

The Diocesan Shrine of San Vicente Ferrer, then known as San Vicente Ferrer Parish, was built in 1946. It is located in Mamatid. It was in 2010 when the parish church declared a Diocesan Shrine dedicated to Saint Vincent Ferrer because of its numerous devotees from different towns, cities and provinces. A relic of Saint Vincent Ferrer is displayed in a museum behind the church.

Poor Clare Monastery of the Blessed Sacrament is a monastery of St. Clare of Assisi located in P. Burgos St., Poblacion I, Cabuyao in the ecclesiastical jurisdiction of the Roman Catholic Diocese of San Pablo. It is one of the religious sites of the city, where large number of devotees come to offer eggs as they pray for the birth of a child. The eggs are donated as food for the poor people. It is one of the monasteries visited by the relic of St. Clare during its visit in the country in 2012.

== Economy ==
Poverty incidence of Cabuyao (%)

Source: Philippine Statistics Authority

Cabuyao is a growing manufacturing mega hub and enterprise city in South Luzon. In 2022, the city had an income of ₱2.8 billion. It was once the richest municipality in the country and now is still among the richest cities in the region outside of Metro Manila in terms of annual income.

Special economic zones and industrial parks in Cabuyao include:

- Light Industry and Science Park I (LISP I)
- Silangan Industrial Park

=== Industries and manufacturing ===
Dubbed the "Enterprise City," Cabuyao hosts one of the largest e-commerce operators in Southeast Asia, Lazada. It is also the location for the distribution hub of J&T Express Philippines, an Indonesian international delivery company, and Ninja Van, a Singaporean logistics company that has its fulfillment hub in Cabuyao, to support small and medium enterprises. The Unilever Philippines has its mega distribution center warehouse in Cabuyao, the largest in the Philippines.

Food and beverages conglomerate Nestlé Philippines, which manufactures Bear Brand powdered milk, has a manufacturing facility in Niugan. Asia Brewery, Tanduay Distillers, also have a plant in Sala. Bakery chain Goldilocks Bakeshop has a plant in Mamatid. NutriAsia, Del Monte Philippines, Procter & Gamble Philippines, San Miguel Brewery's factories, and Samsung Electro-Mechanics Philippines, Universal Robina Corporation, have a plant in LISP I barangay Pittland.

==== Coffee production ====
Cabuyao's Bureau of Plant Industry (BPI) has been reported by the Philippine Statistics Authority (PSA) as one of the major producers of coffee in the country. The City Agriculture Office showed that as of 2017, 58.5 hectares have been planted with 51,638 Robusta coffee trees (38,400 bearing and 13,238 non-bearing) as well as Liberica coffee trees (4,140 bearing and 1,485 non-bearing) in Cabuyao. According to the Department of Agrarian Reform (DAR), 82 families who are beneficiaries of the government's land reform program owned the land planted with the two varieties of coffee, who also formed themselves into the Casile-Guinting Upland Marketing Cooperative (CGUMC) in 2011. CGUMC was awarded the most outstanding community-based cooperative in 2017.

== Government ==
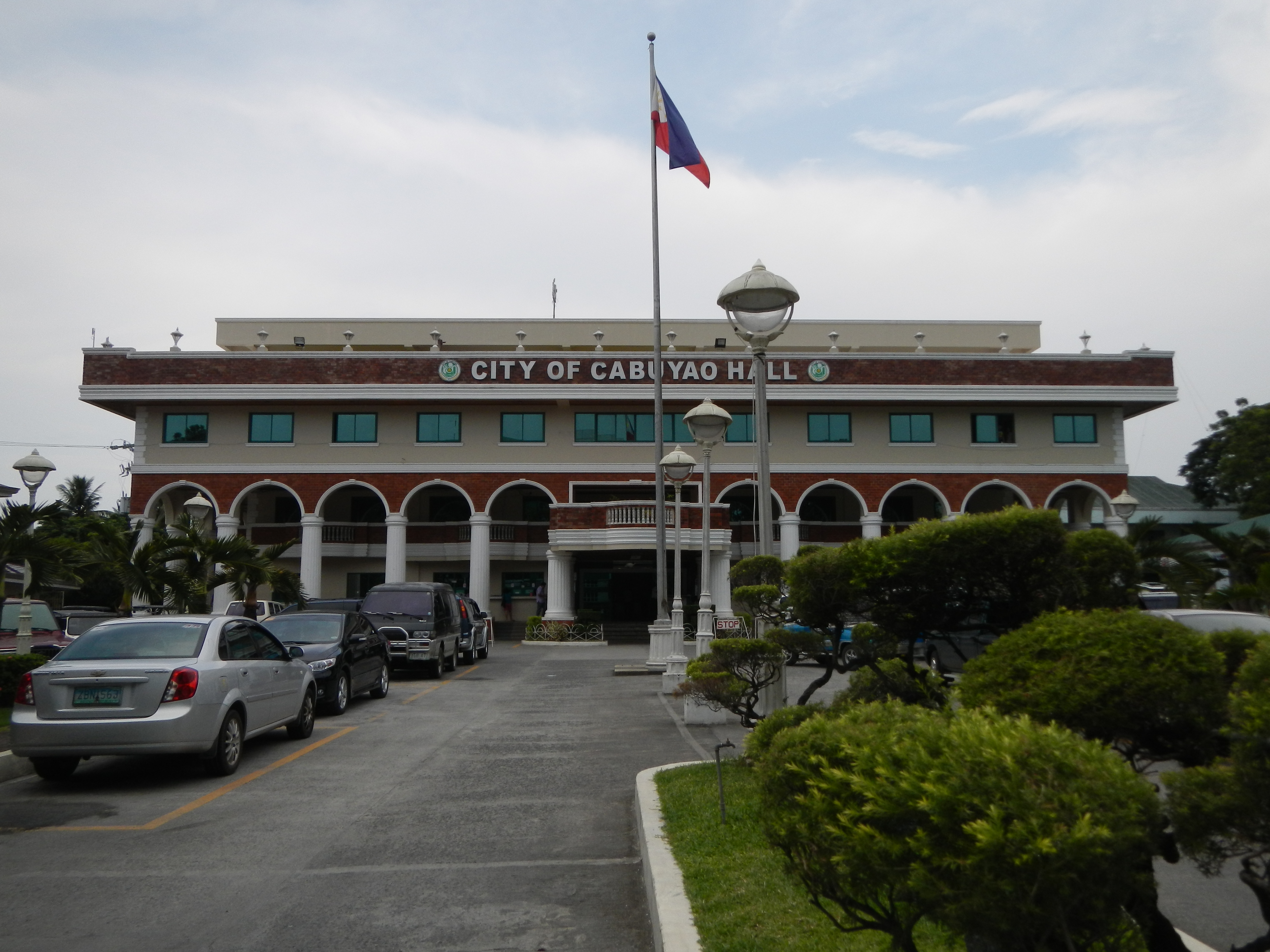
Cabuyao City Hall, located in Sala

=== Elected officials ===
Cabuyao City officials (2025–2028)
Name	Party
House of Representatives
Ramil Hernandez	Lakas
City Mayor
None (Disqualified by COMELEC)	
City Vice Mayor
Jaime Onofre D. Batallones	NUP
City Councilors
Jose Benson G. Aguillo	NUP
Ariel C. Bariring II	NUP
Alexis A. Alimagno	Lakas
Evelyn G. Del Rosario	NUP
Kim M. Hain	NUP
Sherwin D. Beguico	NUP
Rico Mauro G. Alimagno	NUP
Jose Miguel J. Alcabasa	NUP
Emerson L. Devoma	NUP
Maria Fe P. Humarang	NUP
Ex Officio City Council Members
ABC President	Ernani G. Himpisao (Mamatid)
SK President	Nero C. Del Rosario (Banaybanay)

=== Municipal Hall ===
Year	Description
1571 – 1899	The first Municipal Hall of Cabuyao was called "Tribunal del Pueblo". It was during the Spanish period up to 1899.
1905	The house of then Jose Bella, Sr. was temporarily used as Municipal Hall of Cabuyao during American period.
1906 – 1939	From 1906 to 1939, the Municipal Hall of Cabuyao was called "Presidencia."
1940	The Municipal Hall of Cabuyao was constructed in front of St. Polycarp Parish (Uno) but it was destroyed by a fire on May 2, 1962.
1962 – 1964	The temporary Municipal Hall of Cabuyao was beside the St. Polycarp Parish (which is now the City Plaza). It was from June 1962 to May 31, 1964.
1964 – 2000	The new Municipal Hall of Cabuyao was inaugurated on June 12, 1964. It was designed by architect Graciano T. Bailon and the construction was supervised by engineer Jose L. Acuña, both Cabuyeños.
2000 – present	The present Municipal Hall of Cabuyao is a three-storey building with a roof deck located in Sala. It was a project of then Mayor Proceso D. Aguillo and was inaugurated on July 31, 2000.

=== Anthem ===
The official anthem of Cabuyao is "Cabuyao Hymn" or "Imno ng Kabuyaw", it is sung during flag ceremonies of all schools, offices and other institutional/official programs, in the opening of any official gatherings in Manila, before the start of the regular sessions of the Cabuyao City Council, programs or functions of the City Government of Cabuyao and of the barangays; programs or activities initiated, sponsored or coordinated by or with the City Government of Cabuyao; programs, celebrations, or activities initiated or coordinated by accredited and City-registered non-government organizations and civic oriented groups; city and tourism activities of the City Government of Cabuyao in any place as well as in official City gatherings or meetings outside the City; special activities such as those observed during the Cityhood Celebration, Bataan Day, Independence Day, National Heroes Day, Bonifacio Day and Rizal Day along with the country's national anthem, Lupang Hinirang. The anthem was composed by Vehnee Saturno, a native of Cabuyao. The "Cabuyao March" or "Martsa ng Cabuyao" is the official march of the city. The music is by Domingo A. Alconaba and lyrics by Domingo M. Batalla; both also natives of the city. It is sung along with "Calabarzon March", the region's official march.

== Education ==
Pamantasan ng Cabuyao, University of Cabuyao

Number of schools (2010)
Literacy Rate	98%
Elementary	Public: 19; Private: 68
Secondary	Public: 8 Private: 29
Tertiary	Public: 0 Private: 7

Cabuyao has a number of universities and colleges:

No.	College/university	Location
1	Pamantasan ng Cabuyao (University of Cabuyao)	Banay-Banay
2	Cabuyao Institute of Technology	Banay-Banay
3	Mapúa Malayan Colleges Laguna	Diezmo
4	Colegio de Santo Niño de Cabuyao	Barangay Tres
5	St. Vincent College of Cabuyao	Mamatid
6	Our Lady of Assumption College-Cabuyao Campus (Main)	Mamatid
7	Our Lady of Assumption College-Cabuyao Campus (Annex)	Mamatid
8	Southeast Asia Institute of Science, Arts and Technology-Cabuyao Technological Campus	Sala
9	St Ignatius Technical Institute of Business and Arts	Banay-Banay
10	Westbridge Institute of Technology	Banlic

== Infrastructure ==
=== Transportation ===
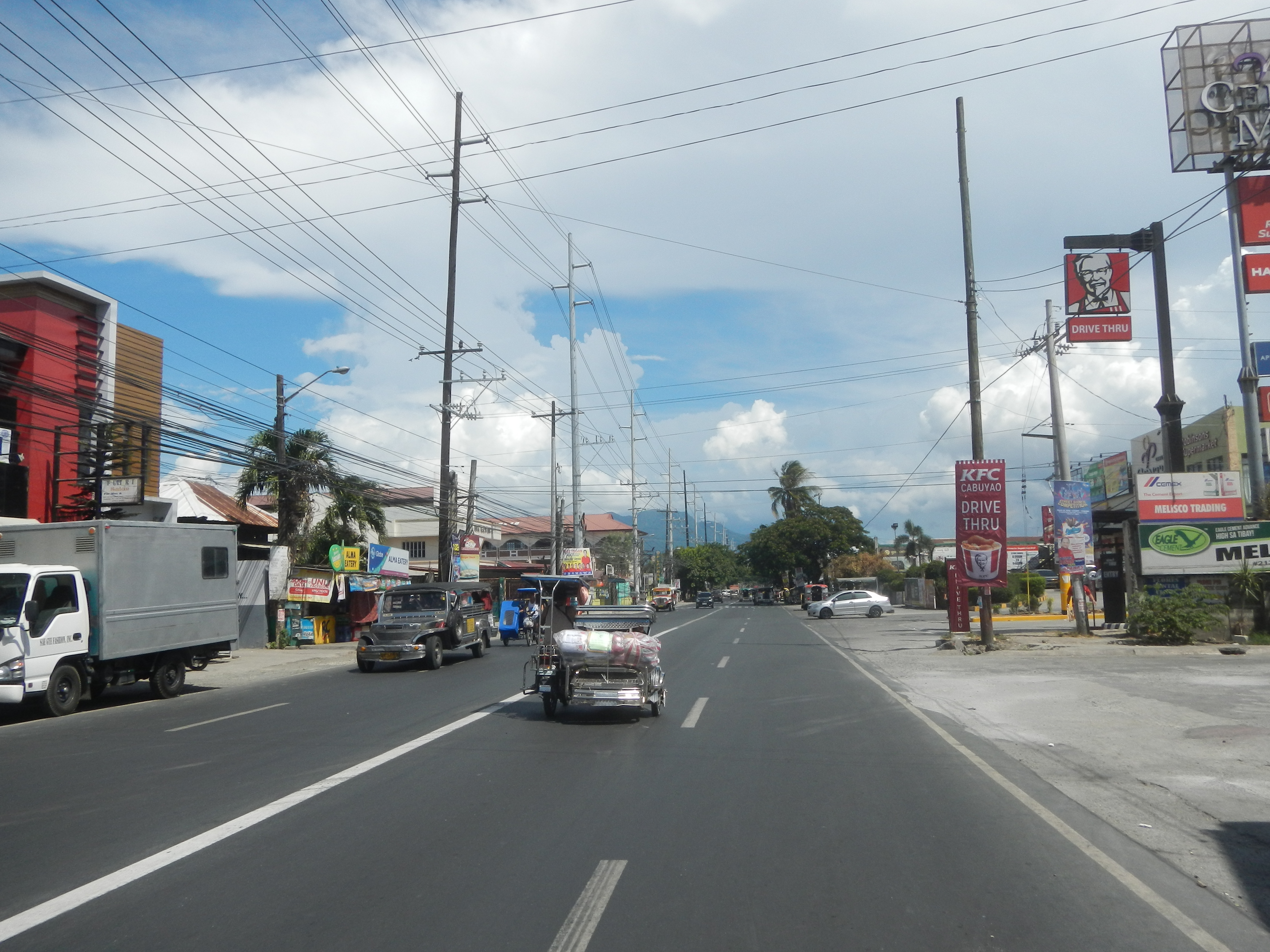
Manila South Road (National Highway) through Cabuyao

Cabuyao is serviced by the South Luzon Expressway (SLEX). Cabuyao Exit is located in the city, while the Eton City (Malitlit) Exit is located near its boundary with Santa Rosa. The city is also accessible through the Silangan Exit in Calamba, which provides access to Carmelray Industrial up to Nuvali Circle.

A four-lane national highway from Alabang, Muntinlupa up to Calamba, Laguna passes through the city. Another road, Canlubang golf road, acts as the access/shortcut route for people going up to the People's park in the sky and to Tagaytay from Nuvali and Silangan Exit.

Public transportation within the city, like in most of the urban areas in the Philippines, is facilitated mostly by inexpensive jeepneys. Tricycles are also used for short distances. The city is served by two railway stations: Cabuyao and Mamatid.

== Culture ==
=== Cabuyao Day ===
Since Cabuyao was founded by Miguel López de Legazpi on January 16, 1571, the city government celebrates "Cabuyao Day" every 16 January. It consists of a week-long celebration starting from a Parade of Floats of each barangay, in which the decorations of each float feature and showcase the way of living of the community of each barangay of Cabuyao. A Street Dancing Competition follows at the City Proper, in which all College and High Schools compete for the said competition. The celebration also includes different amateur shows such as orchestra, band music and celebrity shows at the City Plaza. The highlight of the whole celebration is the official beauty pageant of the city, the "Mutya ng Cabuyao" and "Lakan ng Cabuyao" pageants.

=== Santo Niño de Cabuyao Festival ===
Cabuyao celebrates the feast of the Child Jesus or Santo Niño in the Philippines every third Sunday of January. It starts from a Mass at the Cabuyao Church followed by a festival which all Cabuyeños call "Santo Niño de Cabuyao Festival". It is a parade of all Santos Niños along the City Proper. The festivities and tradition were started in 1981 by the Alimagno family (then Judge Constancio Sr. and wife Mely) as a gesture of thanksgiving as their son Kennedy survived a near fatal accident in 1979.

=== Batingaw Festival ===
The Batingaw Festival commemorates the Kampanang Ginto (Golden Bell), from which the city's nickname "Golden Bell City" is derived. The celebration always starts with the simultaneous ringing of church bells, which Cabuyeños believe brings a good agricultural harvest. The highlights of the five-day festival include the parade of the Kampanang Ginto, colorful street dancing, a singing contest, trade fair exhibits, Mutya and Lakan ng Cabuyao as well as fireworks.

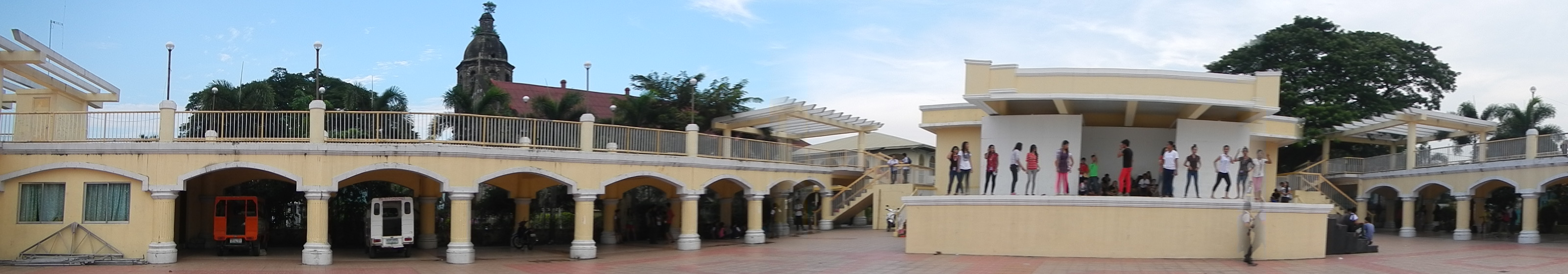
Panoramic view of the Cabuyao City Plaza, which serves as the venue for big events in the city

=== City Fiesta ===
The City Fiesta of Cabuyao is every February 23 in honor of the city's Patron Saint, Saint Polycarp, a bishop and martyr.

== Notable personalities ==
- Salud Algabre, revolutionary and leader of the Sakdal movement
- Anthony Villanueva, boxer, 1964 Summer Olympics silver medalist
- Mercedes Delfinado, acarologist
- Cielito Habito, economist, professor, and columnist
- Nila Aguillo, first female mayor of the city
- Teresita S. Lazaro, former Governor of Laguna
- Sabrina Man, child actress
- Charo Ronquillo, model
- Vehnee Saturno, composer, songwriter, and record producer
- Jake Zyrus (formerly Charice Pempengco), singer

== Sister cities ==
=== Local ===
Sister city	Province
Biñan	Laguna
Liliw	Laguna
Santa Rosa	Laguna
