= 2022 in the Philippines =

- Decades: 2000s; 2010s; 2020s
- See also: List of years in the Philippines; films; music; television; sports

2022 in the Philippines details notable events that occurred in the Philippines in 2022. The COVID-19 pandemic, which largely defined the preceding two years (2020 and 2021), continued into 2022.

== Incumbents ==
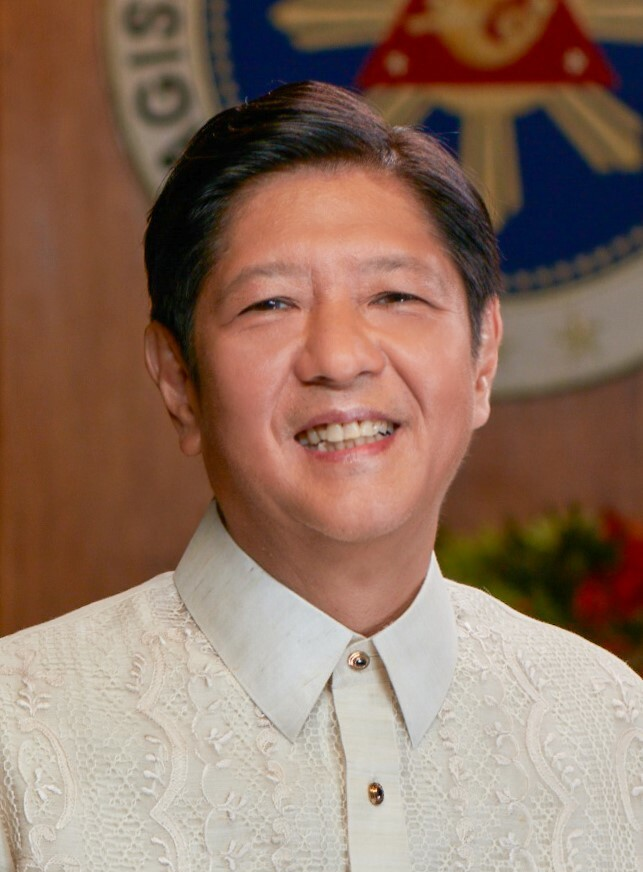
Ferdinand R. Marcos Jr.

Sara Z. Duterte

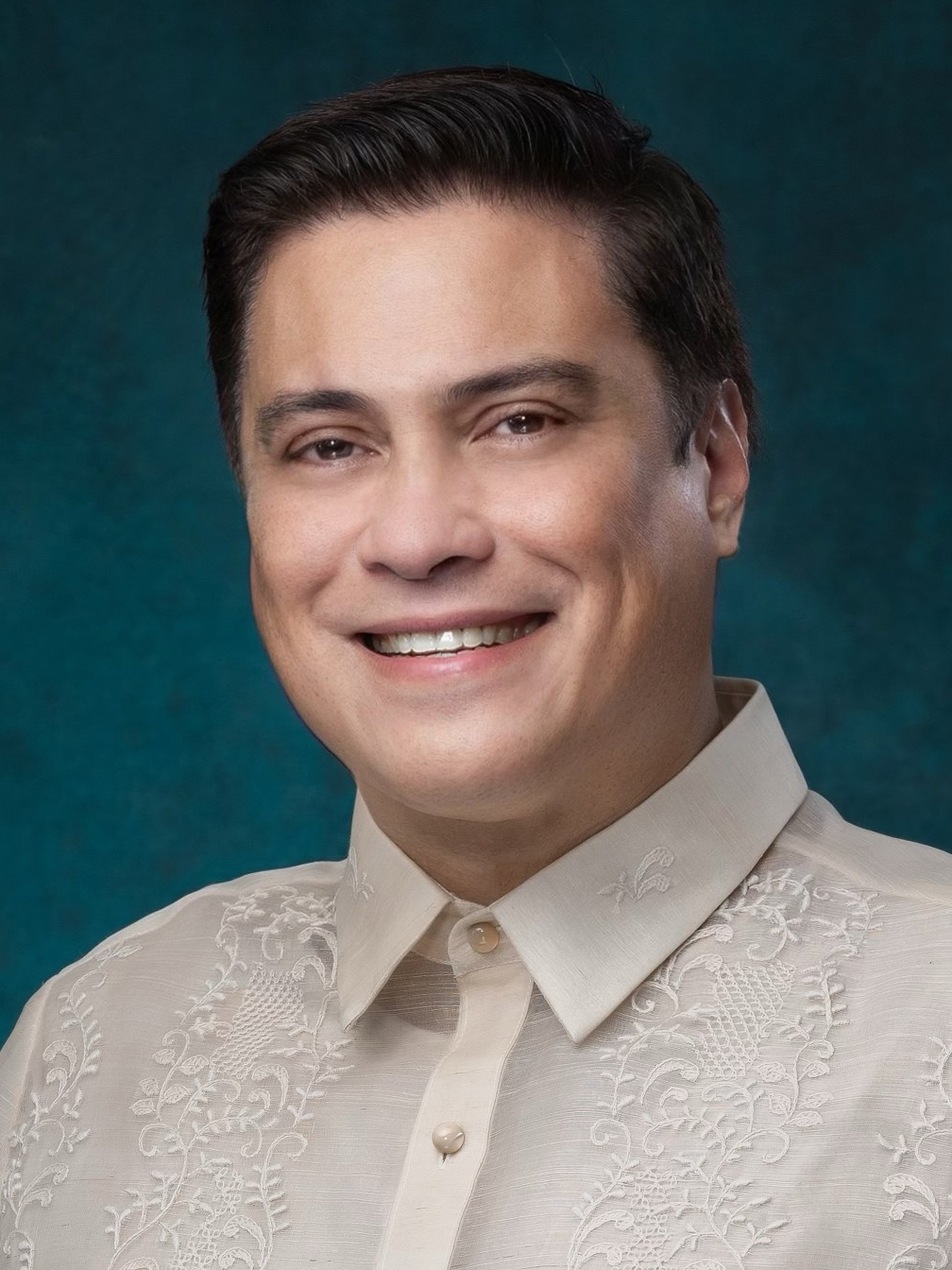
Juan Miguel F. Zubiri

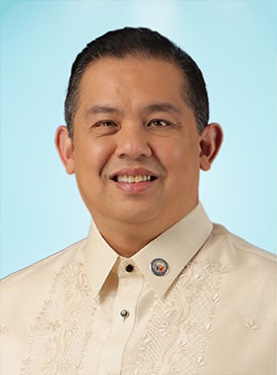
Ferdinand Martin G. Romualdez Sr.

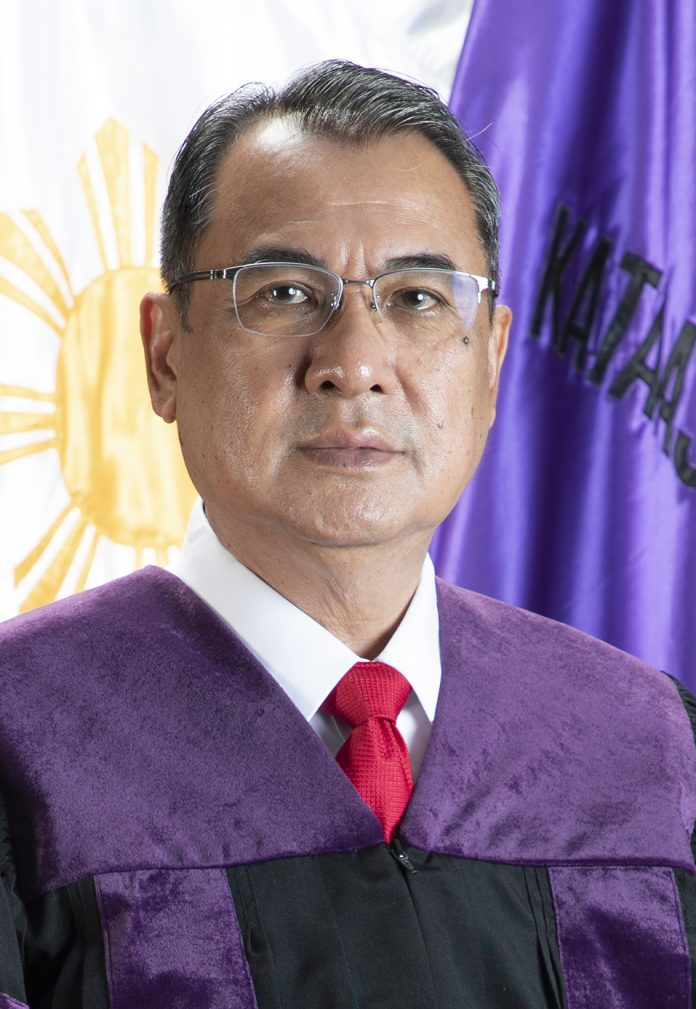
Alexander G. Gesmundo

- President:
  - Rodrigo Duterte (PDP–Laban) (until June 30)
  - Bongbong Marcos (PFP) (from June 30)
- Vice President:
  - Leni Robredo (Liberal) (until June 30)
  - Sara Duterte (Lakas–CMD) (from June 30)
- Congress:
  - Senate President:
    - 18th Congress: Tito Sotto (NPC) (until June 1)
    - 19th Congress: Migz Zubiri (Independent) (from July 25)
  - House Speaker:
    - 18th Congress: Lord Allan Velasco (PDP–Laban) (until June 1)
    - 19th Congress: Martin Romualdez (Lakas-CMD) (from July 25)
- Chief Justice: Alexander Gesmundo

== Ongoing events ==
- COVID-19 pandemic
  - Pharmally scandal
- Philippine sugar crisis

== Events ==
=== January ===
- January 1 – Republic Act No. 11467, which increases the excise tax on alcohol products, electronic cigarettes, and heated tobacco products, takes effect.
- January 6 – President Duterte signs Republic Act No. 11642, that seeks to simplify the process of adoption.
- January 7:
  - Monsignors Lope Robredillo, Eutiquio "Euly" Belizar Jr., and Romeo Solidon of the Roman Catholic Diocese of Borongan in Eastern Samar, are appointed by Pope Francis as the "Chaplains to His Holiness".
  - Juanito Itaas, convicted in 1991 in connection to the murder of United States Army Col. James Rowe, and the country's "longest held political prisoner", is released from the New Bilibid Prison upon order by the Muntinlupa Regional Trial Court allowing him to benefit from the Good Conduct Time Allowance.
- January 11 – President Duterte signs Republic Act No. 11643, which grants survivorship benefits to the legitimate spouse and dependent children of deceased retired members of the National Prosecution Service.
- January 14 – President Duterte signs Republic Act Nos. 11644 and 11645, declaring Carcar, Cebu and San Vicente, Ilocos Sur as heritage zones.
- January 18–19 – The National Bureau of Investigation arrests five suspects in the Banco de Oro hacking in 2021, including two Nigerians, in separate operations in Pampanga and Metro Manila.

=== February ===
- February 4
  - The International Astronomical Union names an asteroid 7431 Jettaguilar in honor of Jose Francisco Aguilar, a medical doctor and amateur astronomer.
  - The United States Federal Bureau of Investigation places three members of Kingdom of Jesus Christ on its most wanted list, among them its founder Apollo Quiboloy, accused of sex trafficking.
- February 18 – Dr. Natividad Castro, an advocate of Lumad communities in Mindanao, is arrested by the Philippine National Police (PNP) in San Juan City. On June 16, the Bayugan Regional Trial Court (RTC), having charges of kidnapping and serious illegal detention case against her dismissed on March 25, orders her rearrest.
- February 23 – The government's Anti-Terrorism Council (ATC), through a January 26 resolution, designates 16 organizations supposedly linked with communist groups as terrorists.

=== March ===
- March 2 – President Duterte signs Republic Act No. 11647, which will amend Foreign Investments Act of 1991 (RA No. 7042) and effectively eases several restrictions on foreign investment.
- March 4 – President Duterte signs RA No. 11648, raising the age of sexual consent and for determining statutory rape, from 12 to 16.
- March 11 – President Duterte signs RA No. 11650 requiring schools nationwide to provide free basic education and related services to learners with disabilities.
- March 21 – President Duterte signs RA No. 11659, amending the Public Service Act (Commonwealth Act No. 146) and allowing full foreign ownership in various, certain sectors.
- March 23 – The Philippine Atmospheric, Geophysical, and Astronomical Services Administration revises its definition of a super typhoon, as well as meanings of tropical cyclone wind signals.
- March 26 – Taal Volcano is placed on Alert Level 3 after its "main crater generated a short-lived phreatomagmatic burst," with plumes reaching as high as 1,500 meters.
- March 31 – The Philippine Air Force (PAF) introduces 1Lt. Jul Laiza Mae Camposano-Beran as the first female fighter pilot at the Basa Air Base in Floridablanca, Pampanga.

=== April ===
- April 8:
  - President Duterte signs Republic Act No. 11691, creating the Office of the Judiciary Marshalls to protect members and personnel of the judiciary.
  - President Duterte signs five laws declaring five separate areas nationwide, including Mount Pulag, Mount Arayat, and Tirad Pass, as protected landscapes.
- April 10–12 – Tropical Storm Megi (Agaton) hits Eastern Visayas and Dinagat Islands, later weakens; devastating the Visayas, parts of Mindanao, and Bicol Region; 344 are reported either dead or missing, mostly from landslides in Baybay and Abuyog in Leyte. Damages are estimated at almost 5 billion pesos. (Note: Tropical Storm Agaton (as of April 24): Deaths: 212; Missing: 132; Displaced: 109,621 families (by Apr. 21); NDRRMC reported damages to agriculture at ₱1.773B (₱1.333B in Regions 6, 8, 10, 12, BARMM + ₱440M in Region 5); infrastructure, ₱6.95M.; DA: ₱3.27B in agriculture (Apr. 25).; DPWH: ₱1.45B in infrastructure, including ₱1.30B in Eastern Visayas (Apr. 20).; State of calamity was declared in Davao de Oro, parts of Iloilo, and municipalities of Cateel, Davao Oriental and Trento, Agusan del Sur. Both casualties and damages were reported in Visayas and Davao Region. Damages were also reported in Northern Mindanao, Soccsksargen and BARMM; Bicol Region; Caraga.) (Note: Leyte landslides: Abuyog: Retrieval operations ended on Apr. 21 with 58 deaths, 99 missing.; Baybay: 123–128 deaths reported in 15 barangays; 56–66 missing.; Retrieval operations ended in Kantagnos on Apr. 24 with 67 deaths, 50 missing.; Retrieval operations ended on Apr. 21 in Mailhi (22 deaths, 4 missing), Bunga (17 deaths, 1 missing) and Pangasugan (2 deaths, 1 missing).; Other deaths were reported in eleven other villages.)
- April 10 – Republic Act No. 11683 lapses into law which seeks to ease conversion of towns into cities but is signed by President Duterte on April 11. The new cityhood law amends Section 450 of Republic Act No. 7160 also known as the Local Government Code of 1991, where a municipality will be exempted from the land and population requirements if it generates at least 100 million pesos for two consecutive years.
- April 12 – The Supreme Court announces the result of the country's first ever digitized and decentralized bar examinations. The 2020/2021 Bar Examinations, dubbed as the "Biggest Bar Ever", have a 72.28% passing rate.
- April 13:
  - President Duterte signs Republic Act No. 11708, creating the Metropolitan Davao Development Authority.
  - President Duterte signs Republic Act No. 11709, granting a three-year fixed term for the chief of staff and other key officials of the Armed Forces of the Philippines.
- April 26 – The Supreme Court rejects with finality all motions for reconsideration of its December 7, 2021 decision challenging the Anti-Terrorism Act of 2020 (Republic Act No. 11479) to declare it as unconstitutional, citing lack of substantial issues and arguments raised by petitioners.
- April 27:
  - The Supreme Court, through a decision upholding the 2011 ruling by the Pasig Regional Trial Court, declares that the Bonifacio Global City complex, along with several surrounding barangays of Makati, is owned by Taguig.
  - The country's longest bridge connecting Cebu City and Cordova, Cebu, part of the Cebu–Cordova Link Expressway project, is inaugurated.

=== May ===
- May 3 – President Duterte approves the recommendation of the Department of the Interior and Local Government to stop e-sabong or online cockfighting operations. On December 28, Pres. Marcos signs Executive Order No. 9, ordering its continuation.
- May 6:
  - President Duterte signs Republic Act (RA) No. 11767 deeming foundlings as natural-born Filipino citizens.
  - The Commission on Human Rights releases its report on the world's first National Inquiry on Climate Change, where climate change is declared as a human rights issue.
- May 9 – National and local elections are held, as mandated by RA No. 7166. Former Senator Bongbong Marcos and Davao City mayor Sara Duterte are elected president and vice president, respectively; twelve senators led by Robin Padilla, and 55 party-lists with ACT-CIS Partylist winning the most seats, are elected to Congress.
- May 12 – The national government orders the adoption digital payments for its disbursements and collections through Executive Order No. 170. This is due to being seen as cashless transaction booms in the last two years in Southeast Asia.
- May 18 – Bro. Armin Luistro FSC, the former education secretary, is named the 28th successor of Saint John Baptist de La Salle, making him the first Filipino to become the Superior General of the De La Salle Brothers worldwide.
- May 21 – Pope Francis approves the promulgation of a decree granting the title of Venerable to the Servant of God Archbishop Teofilo Camomot from Cebu.
- May 26 – Glenn Banaguas, founder of the Environmental and Climate Change Research Institute (ECCRI) receives the United Nations' Sasakawa Award for his initiatives in disaster risk reduction.
- May 27 – The Supreme Court upholds the 2016 Sandiganbayan verdict convicting NBN-ZTE deal whistleblower Jun Lozada of graft charges. Lozada surrenders to authorities on June 2.
- May 31 – The Court of Appeals upholds the 2018 conviction of retired general Jovito Palparan and two other Army officers in connection to the 2006 abduction and disappearance of two University of the Philippines students.

=== June ===
- June 2:
  - Pharmally Pharmaceutical Corporation officials Mohit Dargani and Linconn Ong, held since 2021 in connection with the company's controversy, are released from the Pasay City Jail after six months in detention.
  - Pope Francis names former Manila Archbishop Cardinal Luis Antonio Tagle as one of the new members of the Vatican Congregation for Divine Worship and the Discipline of Sacraments.
- June 4 – Republic Act No. 11861, amending the Solo Parents Welfare Act of 2000 (RA No. 8972) and granting more benefits to single parents, lapses into law.
- June 6:
  - The Quezon City Metropolitan Trial Court acquits 21 residents of Brgy. San Roque arrested during the lockdown in 2020 for protesting out of hunger.
  - The Ombudsman charges 42 dismissed Immigration personnel, including mastermind Marc Mariñas, and a private individual with graft before the Sandiganbayan over the "pastillas" bribery and extortion scheme; dismisses charges against 40 other personnel. They are among 50 individuals, excluding the whistleblower in the case, charged by September. Four other employees have been found administratively liable in March; while one of the respondents would be convicted.
- June 7 – The Sandiganbayan convicts two former officials of the Local Water Utilities Administration, including Surigao del Sur representative Prospero Pichay Jr., of graft for the mismanagement of agency funds in 2009.
- June 8 – The National Telecommunications Commission, upon prior request by National Security Adviser Hermogenes Esperon Jr., orders the country's Internet service providers to block access to more than twenty websites allegedly linked to communist groups. Among these is alternative news site Bulatlat which, in August, is ordered by the Quezon City Regional Trial Court to be temporarily unblocked; the decision would be affirmed on October 10.
- June 9 – More than 80 individuals, who took part in an activity related to a land dispute in Hacienda Tinang, Concepcion, Tarlac, are arrested. They would be released on June 13; charges against them would be dismissed by a municipal trial court.
- June 14 – The Sandiganbayan stops the graft and malversation trial against former Energy Regulatory Commission (ERC) chairperson Zenaida Ducut due to her dementia diagnosis.
- June 15:
  - The Philippines is elected to be the member of the United Nations body that facilitates the implementation of the United Nations Convention on the Law of the Sea (UNCLOS).
  - The Anti-Terrorism Council, through publicized May 25 resolutions, declares six suspected communist leaders including Luis Jalandoni, former chief negotiator of the National Democratic Front, as well as five commanders of Islamic militant groups, as terrorists.
- June 19 – Sara Duterte is inaugurated as the 15th Vice President of the Philippines.
- June 21 – The government scraps a much touted bus rapid transit (BRT) line in Metro Manila amid slow progress, lack of willpower as well as the effect of the pandemic.
- June 22 – USS Samuel B. Roberts, a US Navy destroyer sunk during World War II is found nearly 7,000 meters below sea level off the Philippine coast, making it the deepest shipwreck ever located in the world.
- June 23:
  - President Duterte signs Executive Order No. 174, creating new position titles for school teachers.
  - President Duterte signs Memorandum Order No. 62, ordering the abolition of state-run First Cavite Industrial Estate, Inc. (FCIEI), saying it was no longer serving its purpose.
  - President Duterte orders the termination of the Philippines' joint oil exploration discussions with China.
- June 25 – The National Shrine of Our Lady of Peace and Good Voyage in Antipolo is declared by the Vatican as the first international shrine in the Philippines.
- June 28:
  - The Securities and Exchange Commission affirms its previous order to revoke the certificates of incorporation of Rappler Inc. and Rappler Holdings Corporation. The online news organization continues to operate, defying the said order.
  - The Supreme Court unanimously dismisses cases of disqualification and cancellation of certificate of candidacy against president-elect Bongbong Marcos.
- June 30:
  - The Supreme Court publicizes a March 29 decision dismissing the petition by the Philippine National Bank against the Ombudsman's authority to subpoena the bank accounts of former president Joseph Estrada and others, thus affirming the Ombudsman's 2001 decision and ordering its investigation to proceed.
  - Bongbong Marcos is inaugurated as the 17th President of the Philippines, marking the beginning of his administration.
  - President Marcos signs Executive Order No. 1, ordering the abolition of the Office of the Cabinet Secretary and the Presidential Anti-Corruption Commission (PACC), citing the need for a "just allocation of resources" amid the ongoing health and fiscal crises.
  - President Marcos signs Executive Order No. 2, ordering the reorganization and renaming of the Presidential Communications Operations Office (PCOO) into the Office of the Press Secretary (OPS).

=== July ===
- July 1 – The Apo Reef Natural Park in Occidental Mindoro receives the platinum-level Blue Park Award from the Marine Conservation International at this year's United Nations Ocean Conference in Lisbon, Portugal; the second such recognition after Tubbataha Reef in Palawan in 2017.
- July 7 – Three European Union countries warn their consumers over Lucky Me! noodle soup and pancit canton variants, due to supposed high levels of ethylene oxide, a gas commonly used as pesticide.
- July 8 – The Court of Appeals affirms the cyberlibel conviction of Nobel Peace Prize laureate and Rappler CEO Maria Ressa, and her former colleague by the Manila Regional Trial Court over a 2012 article involving a businessman.
- July 13 – Pope Francis appoints Cardinal Jose Advincula of Manila as a new member of the Vatican's Dicastery for Bishops, which helps the pope pick the next bishops for the dioceses.
- July 23 – Republic Act (RA) No. 11898 lapses into law, amending the Ecological Solid Waste Management Act and requiring large companies to recover their plastic packaging waste to address plastic pollution in the country.
- July 24 – A mass shooting inside the Ateneo de Manila University campus in Quezon City kills three people and injures two others.
- July 25:
  - President Marcos delivers his first State of the Nation Address.
  - The controversial Vaporized Nicotine and Non-Nicotine Products Regulation Act of 2022 lapses into law as advocates push for vape use as alternative for cigarettes.
- July 26 – The Vatican formally designates the Archdiocesan Shrine of St. Anne in Taguig as a minor basilica, one of the 20 churches in the country to have received such honor.
- July 27:
  - A 7.0-magnitude earthquake hits large parts of Luzon; eleven are killed, damages are recorded at around two billion pesos.
  - The University of the Philippines launches the country's first doctoral program in artificial intelligence.
- July 28:
  - RA No. 11908 lapses into law, establishing the Parent Effectiveness Service program in the country which aims to aid parents and substitutes involved in child development.
  - RA No. 11909 lapses into law, making birth, death and marriage certificates permanently valid.
- July 29 – The country's first case of monkeypox is recorded; only four are reported by year-end.
- July 30:
  - RA No. 11929 lapses into law, aiming to establish a separate, Alcatraz-like facility for prisoners convicted of heinous crimes.
  - RA No. 11930 lapses into law, amending the Anti-Pornography Act (RA No. 9775) and requiring internet intermediaries to act against online sexual exploitation of minors.
- July 31 – The Court of Appeals, overturning the Department of Justice's dismissal of complaints filed by model Deniece Cornejo against actor Vhong Navarro through its July 21 decision, orders the filing of charges against the latter related to Cornejo's claim of rape in 2014. On September 19, Navarro surrenders to the NBI following a warrant of arrest issued against him by Taguig Metropolitan Trial Court. On December 5, the Taguig Regional Trial Court grants Navarro's petition to post bail.

=== August ===
- August 9:
  - The Philippine Space Agency and STAMINA4Space announce that Filipino-made cube satellites Maya-3 and Maya-4 re-entered the Earth's atmosphere on August 4 and 8, respectively, ending their missions after ten months in orbit.
  - Angelo Karlo Guillen, a human rights lawyer who survived an assassination attempt in March 2021, wins the 2022 Roger N. Baldwin Medal of Liberty.
- August 10 – The University of the Philippines Visayas Tacloban College announces the first sighting of the Philippine tarsier in Tacloban.
- August 15:
  - The Department of Justice charges 16 individuals, including four Rural Missionaries of the Philippines nuns, before the Iligan Regional Trial Court, for allegations of financing the communist movement.
  - Colegio de San Lorenzo in Quezon City announces halt of operations by September, citing financial problems due to the pandemic.
- August 16 – The World Stroke Organization (WSO) awards several hospitals in the Philippines for having exemplary performance in providing quality medical services.
- August 18 – The Japan International Cooperation Agency (JICA) launches a digital math textbook written in the Visayan language, in a bid to improve how the subject is taught in the country.
- August 21 – Human rights lawyer Chel Diokno is elected as the new chairperson of the Bantayog ng mga Bayani Foundation, a group that advocates freedom, justice and democracy, and gives honor to the heroes of the martial law years.
- August 22:
  - Majority of the schools nationwide hold in-person classes for 27.6-million students as part of transition to such system, which will be fully implemented, mandatory in public schools, on November 2.
  - A motorboat carrying suspected members of the Communist Party of the Philippines and the New People's Army explodes off the coast of Catbalogan, Samar, during an encounter with the military. Eight bodies are retrieved days later. In December, the National Intelligence Coordinating Agency confirms that the couple and communist leaders Benito and Wilma Tiamzon, are among those killed.
- August 23–24 – Severe Tropical Storm Ma-on (Florita) hits northern Luzon, affecting the island with reported damage at ₱1.7 billion. (Note: Severe Tropical Storm Florita: Deaths: 3; Displaced: 2,213 families or 7,716 people; NDRRMC estimated damage to infrastructure at ₱571M (Aug. 30).; DA reported damage to agriculture at ₱1.13B (Aug. 27).; NIA's infrastructure damage was reported at ₱10.85M (by Aug. 30).; Damages were reported in Ilocos Region, Cagayan Valley, CAR; agricultural damages in Central Luzon and Bicol Region. Also affected were Calabarzon and Metro Manila.)
- August 23 – The Philippine government declares war against online child sexual exploitation following such reports during the ongoing pandemic.
- August 31:
  - Doctor Bernadette Madrid is named as one of four recipients of the 2022 Ramon Magsaysay Award.
  - Pope Francis appoints Fr. Jose V.C. Quilongquilong as consultor of the Congregation for Catholic Education that oversees Catholic schools, universities, and institutes of higher education around the world.

=== September ===
- September 3 – Calaca becomes a component city in the province of Batangas after ratification of Republic Act 11554.
- September 8 – The Senate Blue Ribbon Committee recommends the filing of charges against suspended Agriculture Undersecretary Leocadio Sebastian and three former Sugar Regulatory Administration officials over Sugar Order No. 4. The four are cleared by the Office of the President on December 29.
- September 12:
  - President Marcos signs Executive Order No. 3, allowing the voluntary use of face mask in outdoor settings.
  - President Marcos signs Proclamation No. 57, extending (for the last time) the nationwide state of calamity due to COVID-19 pandemic until December 31, when the status lapses.
- September 13 – President Marcos signs an executive order approving a one-year moratorium on the amortization of agrarian reform beneficiaries to ease their debt burden.
- September 17 – In accordance with Republic Act No. 11550, Maguindanao is divided into new provinces of Maguindanao del Norte and Maguindanao del Sur through what will be the most participated province-wide plebiscite by COMELEC.
- September 21 – The Manila Regional Trial Court dismisses the government's petition to declare the Communist Party of the Philippines and the New People's Army as terrorist organizations, citing that rebellion is not an act of terrorism and these groups were not organized to be engaged in the latter.
- September 25–26 – Super Typhoon Noru (Karding) hits Calabarzon and Central Luzon, also devastating the rest of Luzon as well as Western Visayas. Damages are reported at more than three billion pesos. (Note: Super Typhoon Karding: Deaths: 12 (as of Sept. 30; including five provincial disaster response personnel killed in a flash flood in San Miguel, Bulacan on Sept. 25.); Missing: 5 (Oct. 6); Displaced: 91,169 (Oct. 6); NDRRMC reported damage totaling ₱3.36B: infrastructure, ₱304M; agriculture, adjusted to ₱3.053B.; OCD reported damage at ₱3.25B: infrastructure, ₱304M; agriculture, adjusted to ₱2.95B (Oct. 6).; DA reported agricultural damage at ₱3.12B (as of Oct. 3).; State of calamity was declared in Nueva Ecija and 3 other cities and municipalities. Damages were reported in Ilocos Region, Cagayan Valley, CAR; Central Luzon, Calabarzon, Bicol Region; Mimaropa; agricultural in Western Visayas. Metro Manila was affected as well.)
- September 27 – The Masungi Georeserve wins the highest honor for the Inspire Category in the United Nations Sustainable Development Goals Action Awards in Bonn, Germany.
- September 28 – The final phase of decommissioning of the Moro Islamic Liberation Front's fighters begins.
- September 30 – The Liberal Party elects veteran lawmaker Edcel Lagman as its new president, replacing former Senator Francis Pangilinan, who is named party chairman.

=== October ===
- October 1 – In a rare moment, 433 bettors win the jackpot prize, worth more than ₱200-million, of the Grand Lotto 6/55.
- October 3 – Broadcaster Percy Lapid is killed en route to his home in Las Piñas. The killing receives domestic and international condemnation. Later-suspended Bureau of Corrections chief Gerald Bantag and his deputy security officer Ricardo Zulueta are later accused as masterminds.
- October 9 – Three alleged members of the Abu Sayyaf Group detained at the Philippine National Police Custodial Center in Camp Crame, Quezon City are killed in a failed escape attempt, with one of them briefly holding hostage their fellow inmate, former Senator Leila de Lima.
- October 10:
  - Republic Act No. 11934 requiring the registration of SIM cards becomes the first law to be signed under the Marcos Jr. administration after it was vetoed by his predecessor on April 15.
  - Republic Act No. 11935 postponing the December 5 Barangay and Sangguniang Kabataan elections and setting both synchronized elections on the last Monday of October, beginning in 2023, and every three years thereafter is signed by President Marcos.
  - The Sandiganbayan convicts former Maguindanao governor Sajid Ampatuan in the first of series of verdicts in relation to corruption charges filed against him.
- October 19 – Bonuan Buquig National High School in Dagupan wins the World's Best School Prize for Environmental Action for restoring mangroves to reverse the devastation caused by Typhoon Pepeng in 2009.
- October 29–31 – Severe Tropical Storm Nalgae (Paeng) hits central and southern Luzon, including Metro Manila, affecting the entire country with Calabarzon, Bicol Region, Western Visayas and Bangsamoro the hardest-hit regions. Damages are reported at almost twelve billion pesos. (Note: Severe Tropical Storm Paeng: Deaths: 160 (as of Nov. 12); Missing: 29 or 30 (as of Nov. 12); Displaced: 1,953,814 individuals or 590,990 families in all 17 regions. (Oct. 31); Reported damages at ₱11.833B in total, as per NDRRMC: infrastructure, ₱5.436B; agriculture, ₱6.397B. (as of Nov. 12); By Nov. 13, a localized state of calamity was declared in seven provinces and 529 cities and municipalities. On Nov. 2, the declaration was made by Pres. Marcos through Proclamation No. 84, covering the worst-hit regions: Calabarzon, Bicol Region, Western Visayas and BARMM. It was also declared in Zamboanga City.; Damages and casualties were both reported in Bicol Region, Western Visayas as well as Soccsksargen and in Calabarzon; casualties in Eastern Visayas, Zamboanga Peninsula, BARMM, Central Luzon, CAR. Damages in Mimaropa and Northern Mindanao; infrastructural damage in Central Visayas and Davao Region.)

=== November ===
- November 3 – Australian sex offender Peter Scully is convicted by the Misamis Oriental Regional Trial Court in relation to 60 cases of human trafficking and child abuse, the last batch of those filed against him, in Cagayan de Oro, and is given a 129-year prison sentence. His Filipina girlfriend is sentenced to 126 years imprisonment. It is the second conviction for Scully, who had been given prison sentences in 2018 for the same offenses.
- November 7 – The Philippines lifts a ban on the deployment of workers, including maids and construction workers, to Saudi Arabia, after steps are taken to reduce frequent abuses.
- November 8 – Clashes erupt between the Philippine Army and the Moro Islamic Liberation Front in Ungkaya Pukan, Basilan with the former conducting clearing operations against "lawless elements" in the area controlled by the latter threatening the Bangsamoro peace process. Fighting continued until November 10 when a ceasefire was signed between two sides.
- November 10 – The Caloocan Regional Trial Court convicts Police Officer 1 Jefrey Perez for the torture and planting of evidence on Carl Angelo Arnaiz and Reynaldo de Guzman, who were killed during the country's drug war in 2017.

=== December ===
- December 5 – After two years of closure, the Light Rail Manila Corporation (LRMC) reopens the Roosevelt Station of the Light Rail Transit Line 1 (LRT1).
- December 7 – Republic Act No. 11596, a law signed in 2021 banning child marriage in the country, is officially implemented.
- December 9
  - The United States Department of the Treasury imposes sanctions on KOJC pastor Apollo Quiboloy and around 40 others across nine countries for alleged involvement in corruption and human rights abuses.
  - An ambush followed by an encounter between members of the Citizen Armed Force Geographical Unit and some 50 lawless elements in Aleosan, Cotabato resulted in the deaths of six militiamen and three gunmen.
- December 17 – Baliwag becomes a component city in the province of Bulacan through ratification of Republic Act No. 11929.
- December 18 – Flooding begins in Mimaropa and Bicol regions, Visayas and major parts of Mindanao due to heavy rains brought by a shear line. Damages are estimated at ₱1.46-billion; 52 deaths and 18 missing persons are reported.
- December 27 – Mandatory registration of SIM card starts after its implementing rules and regulations are released by National Telecommunications Commission.

== Holidays ==
On October 29, 2021, through Proclamation No. 1236, the national government declares holidays and special (working/non-working) days to be observed in the country.

=== Regular ===
- January 1 – New Year's Day
- April 9 – Araw ng Kagitingan (Day of Valor)
- April 14 – Maundy Thursday
- April 15 – Good Friday
- May 1 – Labor Day
- May 3 – Eid'l Fitr (Feast of Ramadan)
- June 12 – Independence Day
- July 9 – Eid'l Adha (Feast of Sacrifice)
- August 29 – National Heroes Day
- November 30 – Bonifacio Day
- December 25 – Christmas Day
- December 30 – Rizal Day

=== Special (Non-working) ===
Previously declared as special non-working holidays, the All Souls' Day (November 2), Christmas Eve (December 24) and the last day of the year (December 31), had been declared as "special (working) days" since 2021, in an effort for economic recovery during the COVID-19 pandemic.

- February 1 – Chinese New Year
- February 25 – EDSA People Power Revolution Anniversary
- April 16 – Black Saturday
- May 9 – Election Day
- August 21 – Ninoy Aquino Day
- October 31 – Special non-working holiday
- November 1 – All Saints Day
- December 8 – Feast of the Immaculate Conception
- December 26 – Special non-working holiday

== Business and economy ==
=== January ===
- January 4 – The Philippines and Japan renew the Bilateral Swap Arrangement, granting currency exchange between the Philippine peso and the Japanese yen.
- January 5 – Bangko Sentral ng Pilipinas (BSP) Governor Benjamin Diokno is named the Global Central Banker of the Year 2022, by the international banking magazine The Banker.
- January 18 – The Department of Transportation signs a contract worth ₱142 billion with a joint venture involving China Railway Group Limited for the first phase of the extension of the Philippine National Railways system to the Bicol Region.
- January 25 – The National Telecommunications Commission (NTC) gives both the analog and digital broadcast frequencies previously held by ABS-CBN Corporation to Advanced Media Broadcasting System, Sonshine Media Network International and Aliw Broadcasting Corporation.
- January 31 – The Philippine Stock Exchange halts the trading shares of Dito CME Holdings Corporation after the company announces that it was canceling its stock rights offer.

=== February ===
- February 3 – London firm OneWeb with the Philippine Space Agency (PhilSA) test connectivity services in rural areas in the country.
- February 4 – The Bankers Association of the Philippines and the Department of Justice sign an accord to work together in raising cybersecurity awareness and curbing cybercrimes in the country.
- February 9 – The Japan International Cooperation Agency extends a ¥329-million grant to the Philippines aimed at further developing human resources in the country.

=== March ===
- March 31 – SpaceX announces that it would launch its Starlink satellite broadband service in the Philippines, a first in Southeast Asia. The service is expected to be available in the fourth quarter of the year 2022.

=== April ===
- April 1 – The Fiscal Incentive Review Board of the Department of Finance orders IT-BPO companies to return to work onsite through its Resolution No. 19-21. The board's resolution allows work-from-home (WFH) arrangements for 90% of their workforce until March 31, 2022. But the latter push to extend the arrangement until September 12, 2022 but the former denies the extension requests.
- April 6 – The BSP launches the new ₱1,000 polymer banknote featuring the Philippine eagle in place of three World War 2 heroes, despite earlier criticisms from historians.
- April 25 – Sun Cellular postpaid service is rebranded as Smart postpaid product of Smart Communications. The move resulted to officially defunct the former.
- April 28 – The BSP approves sanctions against BDO Unibank and UnionBank over a hacking incident that affected depositors in December 2021.

=== May ===
- May 27 – The NTC approves the registration of Starlink Internet Services Philippines Inc., a subsidiary of SpaceX with headquarters in California. Starlink Philippines will operate as a Value-added service provider.

=== June ===
- June 6 – A hostile takeover of Okada Manila that involved kidnapping occurs.

=== July ===
- July 22 – Banco de Oro, the country's largest private financial institution, moves to foreclose on the loan collateral of Dennis Uy, beginning a series of moves that threaten to lead to the largest corporate default in Philippine history.
- July 29 – The Makati Prosecutor's Office junks falsification raps against Japanese gaming tycoon Kazuo Okada filed by a rival faction of his company, Tiger Resort Leisure & Entertainment, Inc. (TRLEI), which operates Okada Manila.

=== August ===
- August 10:
  - The Securities and Exchange Commission revokes the registration of Katuwang Poultry Chicken Egg Producing Corporation for illegally soliciting investments from the public online.
  - President Marcos rejects the Sugar Order No. 4 draft, a proposal to import an additional 300,000 metric tons of sugar, amidst a sugar crisis. This leads to the resignation of Sugar Regulatory Administration officials and an investigation by Congress.
  - A joint agreement between ABS-CBN Corporation and MediaQuest Holdings is officially signed. The agreement lasts for a month.
- August 26 – The Department of Trade and Industry (DTI) and the International Labour Organization (ILO) signs a Japan-supported memorandum of understanding that was part of the $2.2 million Japan-ILO project called Bringing Back Jobs Safely under the COVID-19 Crisis in the Philippines: Rebooting Small and Informal Businesses Safely and Digitally.

=== September ===
- September 2 – The Philippine Amusement and Gaming Corporation (PAGCOR) orders the group of businessman Antonio "Tonyboy" Cojuangco to cease and desist from running Okada Manila.
- September 5 – Digital payments platform Visa announces the appointment of Jeff Navarro as the new manager for the Philippines and Guam, following his stint in Western Union.
- September 9 – Ayala Corporation president, CEO and vice chairman of the board Fernando Zobel de Ayala, who is on medical leave, resigns from his positions to focus on his health and recovery.

=== October ===
- October 17 – Kazuo Okada is arrested by authorities upon his arrival in Manila, for grave coercion cases filed by former business partners and executives.

== Entertainment and culture ==
=== January ===
- January 8 – Van Ferro wins two BroadwayWorld Chicago Awards, the first Filipino to win the awards and the first actor in Chicago to win two awards in the same season.
- January 28 – Sinigang is named as the Best Soup in the world by TasteAtlas.
- January 29 – The films The Headhunter's Daughter by Don Josephus Eblahan and 's Leonor Will Never Die by Martika Ramirez Escobar win prizes at the Sundance Film Festival 2022 awards ceremony.

=== March ===
- March 17 – Tracy Perez finishes in the Top 13 at Miss World 2021 in San Juan, Puerto Rico, Puerto Rico.
- March 18 – Kathleen Paton is crowned Miss Eco International 2022 in Egypt.

=== April ===
- April 3 – Michelle Arceo wins 1st runner-up in the Miss Environment International 2022 pageant in Mumbai, India.
- April 12 – Director Brillante Mendoza received a lifetime achievement award, actors Christian Bables and Vince Rillon win best actor award, while Erik Matti's On the Job: The Missing 8 wins the award for Best Film at the 19th Asian Film Festival in Rome.
- April 25 – Novelist Gina Apostol is selected as one of four fellows in literature of the prestigious Rome Prize.
- April 28 – The film Uncharted starring Tom Holland and Mark Wahlberg, produced by Sony Pictures is pulled out from cinemas due to a scene showing China's nine-dash map illustrating its disputed claim over the South China Sea.
- April 30 – Celeste Cortesi of Pasay is crowned Miss Universe Philippines in its pageant's coronation night.

=== May ===
- May 1 – Kriz Gazmen is named as the new head of ABS-CBN Films, replacing Olivia Lamasan who becomes consultant for content, partnerships, and talent management via Rise Artists Studio of the same company.
- May 28 – Triangle of Sadness and Plan 75, two films featuring Overseas Filipino Workers (OFWs), win top prizes at the 2022 Cannes Film Festival.
- May 29 – Singer Anji Salvacion from the Celebrity Edition was proclaimed as the winner of Pinoy Big Brother: Kumunity Season 10.

=== June ===
- June 5 – Gwendolyne Fourniol of Negros Occidental is crowned Miss World Philippines in its pageant's coronation event.
- June 7 – The Cinemalaya Philippine Independent Film Festival announces the top 13 finalists for its 2022 full-length film competition.
- June 10 – President Duterte declares Nora Aunor, Salvacion Lim-Higgins, Agnes Locsin, Fides Cuyugan-Asensio, Ricky Lee, Gémino Abad, Tony Mabesa and Marilou Diaz-Abaya as National Artist of the Philippines for 2022.
- June 18 – The coronation event of the Man of the World 2022 pageant is held in Baguio. This is the first time that the Philippines hosted the event. Aditya Khurana of India was crowned as Man of the World 2022.
- June 19 – Basurero, a short film featuring actor Jericho Rosales, wins the Grand Jury Best Global Film award at the Auntyland Film Festival 2022 awards ceremony.
- June 29 – Jollibee is hailed as the "best fried chicken chain in America" by food website Eater.

=== July ===
- July 6 – Bibingka is included in the top 15 best-rated cakes in the world by TasteAtlas.
- July 7 – Five restaurants from the Philippines are included in the Top Restaurants in Asia 2022 list of Opinionated About Dining (OAD), a global ranking system.
- July 13 – Boracay is included among the "World's 50 Greatest Places in 2022" by TIME Magazine.
- July 16:
  - Boracay, Palawan, and Cebu are included in the list of "25 Best Islands in the World" by New York-based magazine Travel + Leisure.
  - Alison Black finishes in the Top 24 at Miss Supranational 2022 in Nowy Sącz, Poland.
  - Filipino students take home two bronze medals at the 63rd International Mathematical Olympiad (IMO) in Oslo, Norway.
- July 17 – RaÉd Fernandez Al-Zghayér finishes in the Top 20 at Mister Supranational 2022 in Nowy Sącz.
- July 22 – Angela Clare Lim Tan, Alexis Griff Genovatin and Arthur Caleb Co win gold medals and a silver at the 2022 Copernicus Math Olympiad in New York City.
- July 30 – ABS-CBN actress and executive Charo Santos-Concio and musical film Katips wins top awards in the 70th FAMAS Awards which was held at the Manila Metropolitan Theater.
- July 31 – Nicole Borromeo of Cebu is crowned Binibining Pilipinas–International in the pageant's coronation event.

=== August ===
- August 6 – Jenny Ramp of Tarlac is crowned Miss Philippines Earth in its pageant's coronation event.
- August 8:
  - Airbnb releases a list of its 12 best hosts under the age of 30 in the Asia Pacific region, and it includes Dwyane Yra Dinglasan and Deo Dia.
  - Tortang talong is included in the best egg dish in the world by TasteAtlas.
- August 10 – Three restaurants in the Philippines are recognized by an Italian-based online guidebook as among the best pizza places in the Asia-Pacific region.
- August 12:
  - The famous Dancing Inmates of the Cebu Provincial Detention and Rehabilitation Center are relaunched by the provincial government of Cebu.
  - FPJ's Ang Probinsyano, the country's longest-running television series which premiered in 2015, ends as announced by actor Coco Martin on its July 22 episode.
  - The first drop for the non-fungible token collection of Idol Philippines takes place as part of a promotion. The singing television competition becomes the first Philippine television program to launch its own NFT collection.
- August 14 – The Baseball Player and Blue Room win top prizes at the Cinemalaya Philippine Independent Film Festival 2022.
- August 18 – Four paintings by Fernando Amorsolo, the first National Artist of the Philippines, are donated to the National Museum of the Philippines.
- August 19 – Kare-kare is included in the 100 best-rated stews in the world by TasteAtlas.
- August 20 – Kapuso Mo, Jessica Soho wins the Top Media Publisher Award at the TikTok Awards Philippines 2022.
- August 26 – The Broken Marriage Vow, ABS-CBN's adaptation of BBC One's hit global drama "Doctor Foster", wins the Best TV Format Adaptation (Scripted) in Asia category at the ContentAsia Awards in Bangkok, Thailand.
- August 29 – Vogue Philippines releases its first issue featuring Chloe Magno, a Filipino-American model from Davao.

=== September ===
- September 5 – ABS-CBN actress Belle Mariano is named as one of the recipients of the Outstanding Asian Star Prize at the 2022 Seoul International Drama Awards. On September 22, Mariano finally receives her Outstanding Asian Star award at Seoul International Drama Awards in South Korea.
- September 8 – The Philippines is named at the 29th World Travel Awards as Asia's leading beach and dive destination.
- September 13 – ABS-CBN's "Kapamilya Himig Handog" songwriting contest and "Act As If You Have the Virus" internal communications campaign wins the top prize at the prestigious 2022 Silver Quill Awards given by the International Association of Business Communicators (IABC) Asia Pacific.
- September 18 – Khimo Gumatay of Makati becomes the second Idol Philippines grand champion.
- September 20:
  - The Museo ng Pag-asa of the Angat Buhay Foundation is opened to the public.
  - Filipino-South African poet Jim Pascual Agustin is awarded the 2022 Gaudy Boy Poetry Book Prize by New York-based press Singapore Unbound for his work "Waking Up to the pattern Left by a Snail Overnight".
- September 25:
  - The Museo Pambata is re-opened to the public.
  - Lea Salonga is named as one of the recipients of Time magazine's TIME100 Impact Awards for the year 2022.
- September 27 – The Philippine International Convention Center (PICC) is declared a national cultural treasure.
- September 28 – Lumpiang Shanghai is included in the Top 50 best street snacks around the globe by TasteAtlas.
- September 29:
  - ABS-CBN News chief Regina "Ging" Reyes is named the 2022 Southeast Asia Laureate for Women in News Editorial Leadership by the World Association of News Publishers for her exceptional contribution to the newsroom, editorial integrity, and outstanding leadership.
  - GMA News and Public Affairs' "Dapat Totoo" campaign wins the Best in Audience Engagement award at the Digital Media Awards Worldwide organized by the World Association of News Publishers.
- September 30 – 16 ABS-CBN shows and personalities are nominated as the national winners of the Asian Academy Creative Awards.

=== October ===
- October 1 – Joshua De Sequera wins 1st runner-up in the Manhunt International 2022 pageant in Manila.
- October 4 – Shangri-La Boracay and El Nido Resorts are voted among the best in the world in Conde Nast Traveler's Readers' Choice Awards for 2022.
- October 7 – The Tumindig artwork, created by Kevin Eric Raymundo, better known as "Tarantadong Kalbo", is among nine Filipino projects recognized at the Good Design Awards 2022.
- October 12 – Precious Paula Nicole becomes the first winner of Drag Race Philippines at the conclusion of the series at Okada Manila.
- October 14:
  - Chicken inasal ranks 5th out of 50 in Taste Atlas' latest list of best chicken dishes in the world.
  - Gabrielle Basiano finishes in the Top 20 at Miss Intercontinental 2022 in Egypt.
- October 15 – Chelsea Fernandez finishes in the Top 15 at Miss Globe 2022 in Tirana, Albania.
- October 19 – Beauty queen-actress Pia Wurtzbach becomes the highest earning Instagram user from the Philippines in 2021, according to NetCredit.
- October 25 – Roberta Tamondong finishes in the Top 20 at Miss Grand International 2022 in Bali and Jakarta, Indonesia. She was later appointed by the organization as the 5th runner-up on October 30, following of the resignation of Yuvna Rinishta of Mauritius, three days after the coronation night.
- October 30 – MJ Ordillano wins 4th runner-up in the Mister International 2022 pageant in Quezon City.

=== November ===
- November 4 – Kylie Verzosa wins Best Actress for her role in The Housemaid at the Distinctive International Arab Festivals Awards (DIAFA) 2022.
- November 7 – Binibining Pilipinas Charities announces their withdrawal of Miss Grand International (MGI) pageant franchise. On November 24, MGI and ALV Pageant Circle launches the Miss Grand Philippines pageant.
- November 10 – Wanderlust Travel Magazine names Palawan as the world's "Most Desirable Island" for 2022.
- November 11 – Actor, singer, and television presenter Billy Crawford wins the twelfth season of the French version of the competition series Dancing with the Stars.
- November 17 – Disney+, a streaming service owned by Disney Media and Entertainment Distribution (a division of The Walt Disney Company), is launched in the country.
- November 29 – Jenny Ramp finishes in the Top 20 of Miss Earth 2022 at its coronation night in Okada Manila.
- November 30 – Meiji Cruz wins the Miss CosmoWorld 2022 pageant in Malaysia.

=== December ===
- December 1 – The first part of the annual Asian Television Awards, for the Entertainment and Performance categories, is held at the Aliw Theater in Pasay. The second will be held in Singapore a week later.
- December 2 – Actress Coleen Garcia wins the Best Actress award at the 2022 El Grito International Fantastic Film Festival in Venezuela for her performance in the suspense-thriller film Kaluskos.
- December 8 – Actress Jodi Sta. Maria wins Best Actress at the 2022 Asian Academy Creative Awards for her role as Dr. Jill Illustre in the network's adaptation of the British drama series Doctor Foster, locally titled The Broken Marriage Vow.
- December 10:
  - Maalaala Mo Kaya, Asia's longest-running drama anthology which premiered in 1991, airs its final episode.
  - Justine Felizarta wins the title of 1st runner-up in the Miss Tourism World 2022 pageant in Vietnam.
- December 12 – Beatriz McLelland wins the title of 1st runner-up in the Miss Eco Teen International 2022 in Egypt.
- December 13 – Hannah Arnold finishes in the top 15 at the Miss International 2022 pageant in Tokyo, Japan.

== Sports ==
- May 12–23 – The Philippines participates at the 31st Southeast Asian Games in Vietnam, finishing at fourth overall with 52 gold, 70 silver, and 104 bronze medals.

== Deaths ==
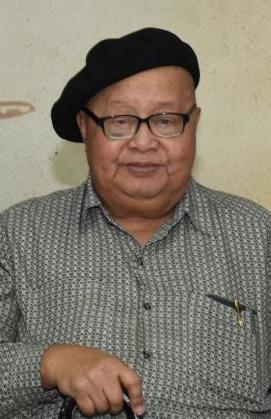
F. Sionil José

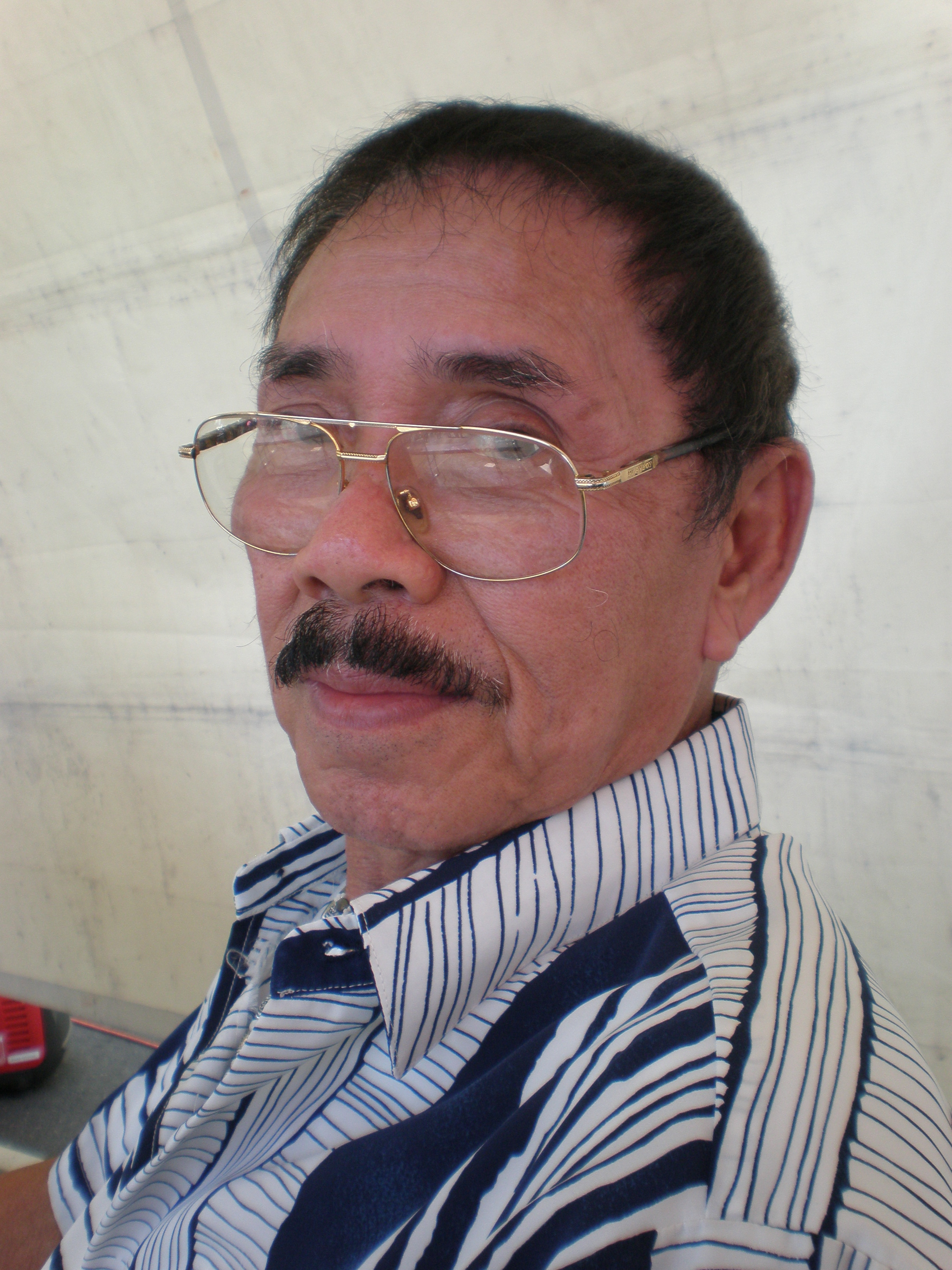
Don Pepot

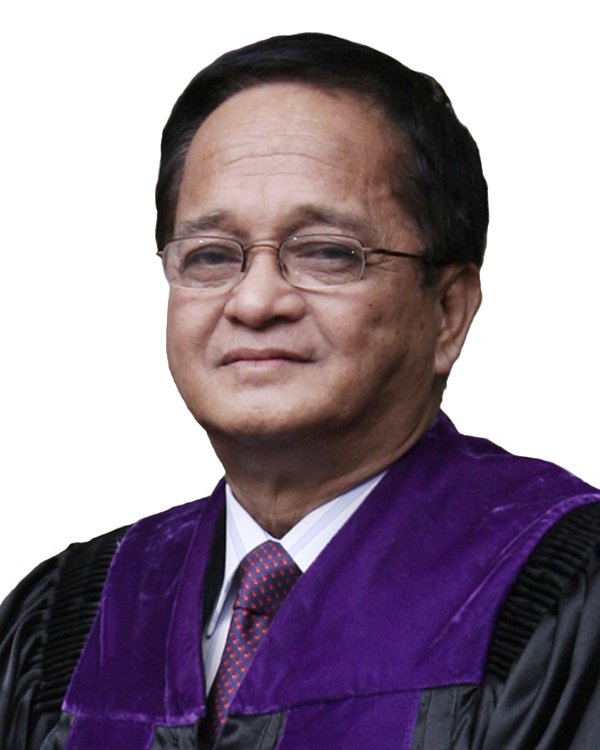
Antonio Nachura

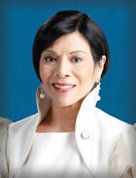
Regina Reyes Mandanas

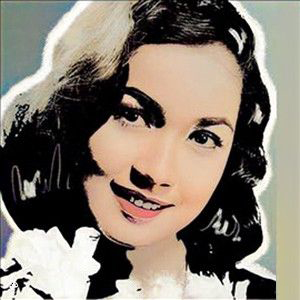
Susan Roces

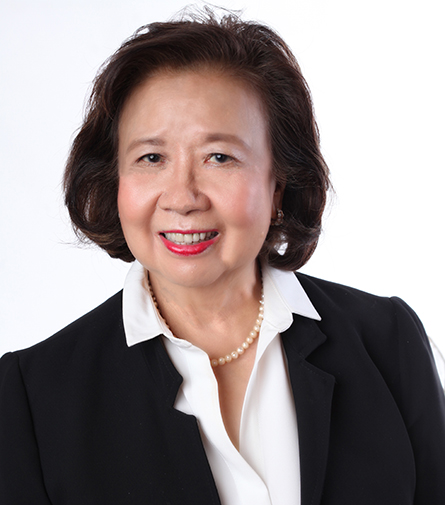
Carmen Pedrosa

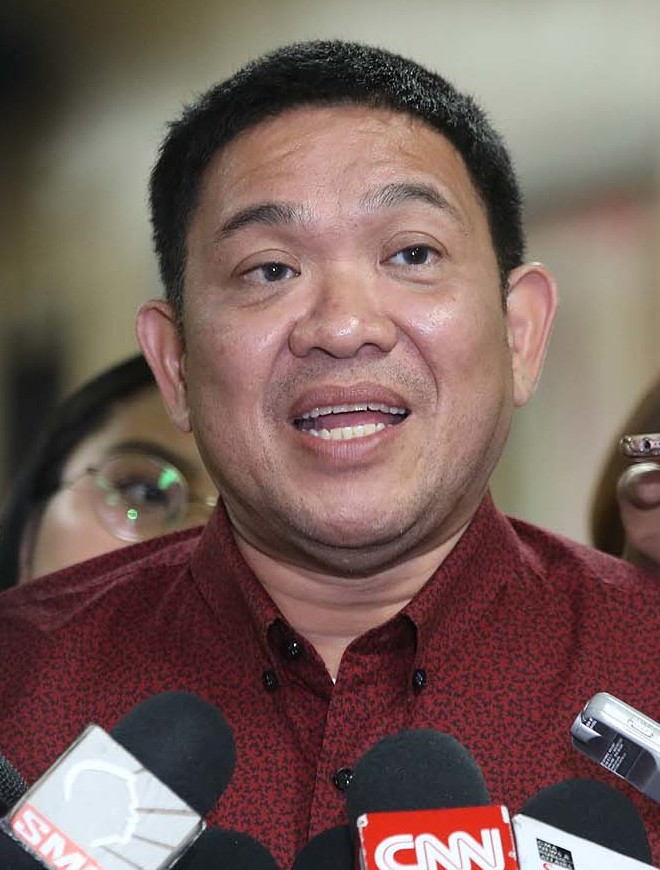
Rolando Andaya Jr.

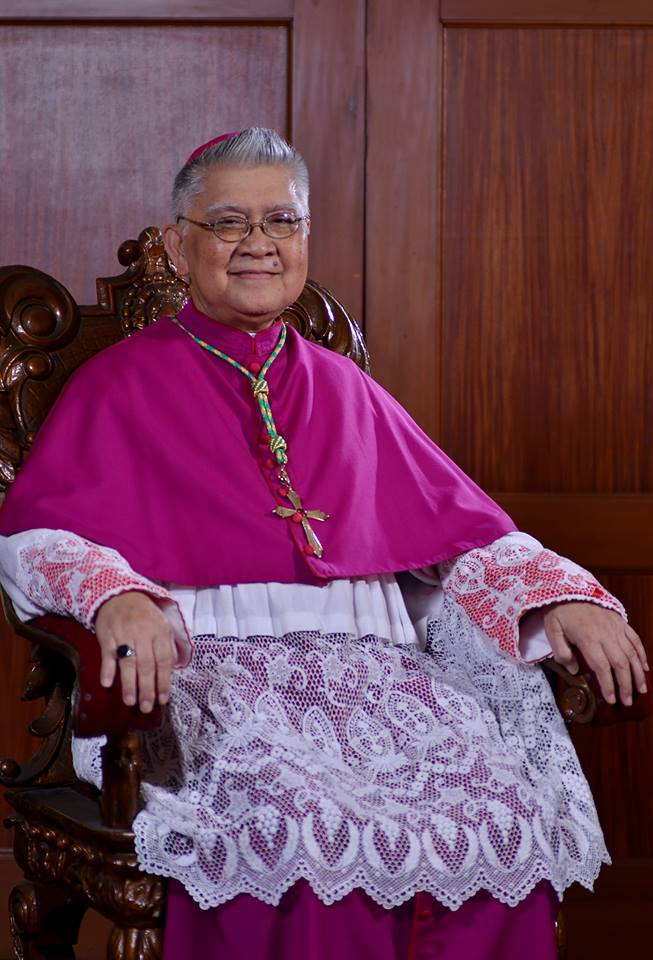
Angel Lagdameo

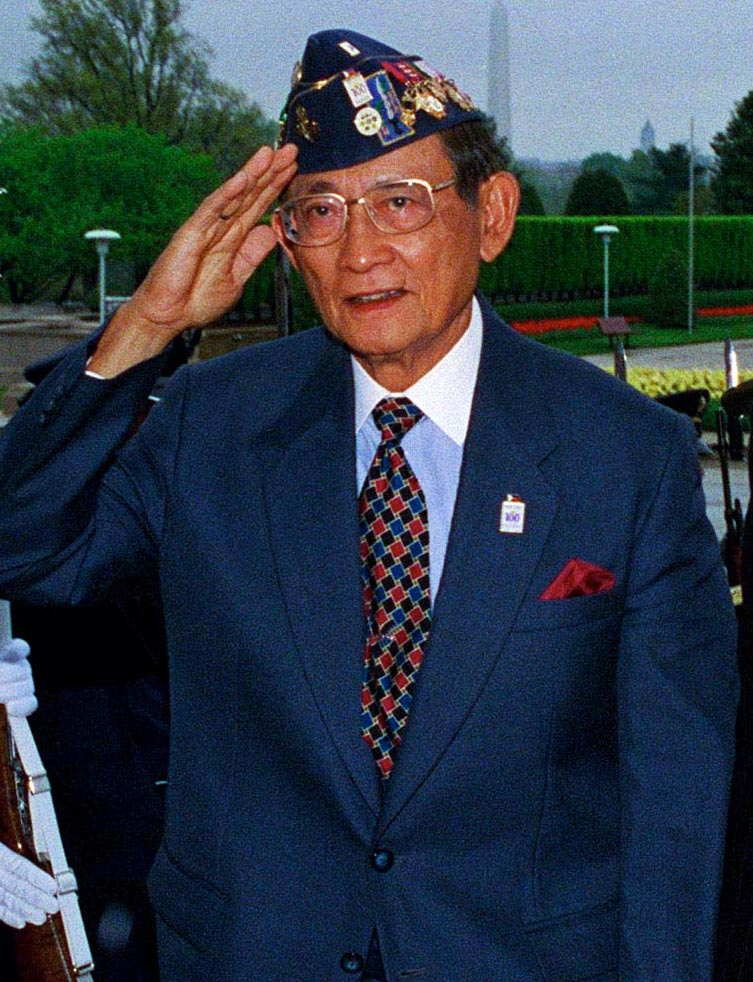
Fidel V. Ramos

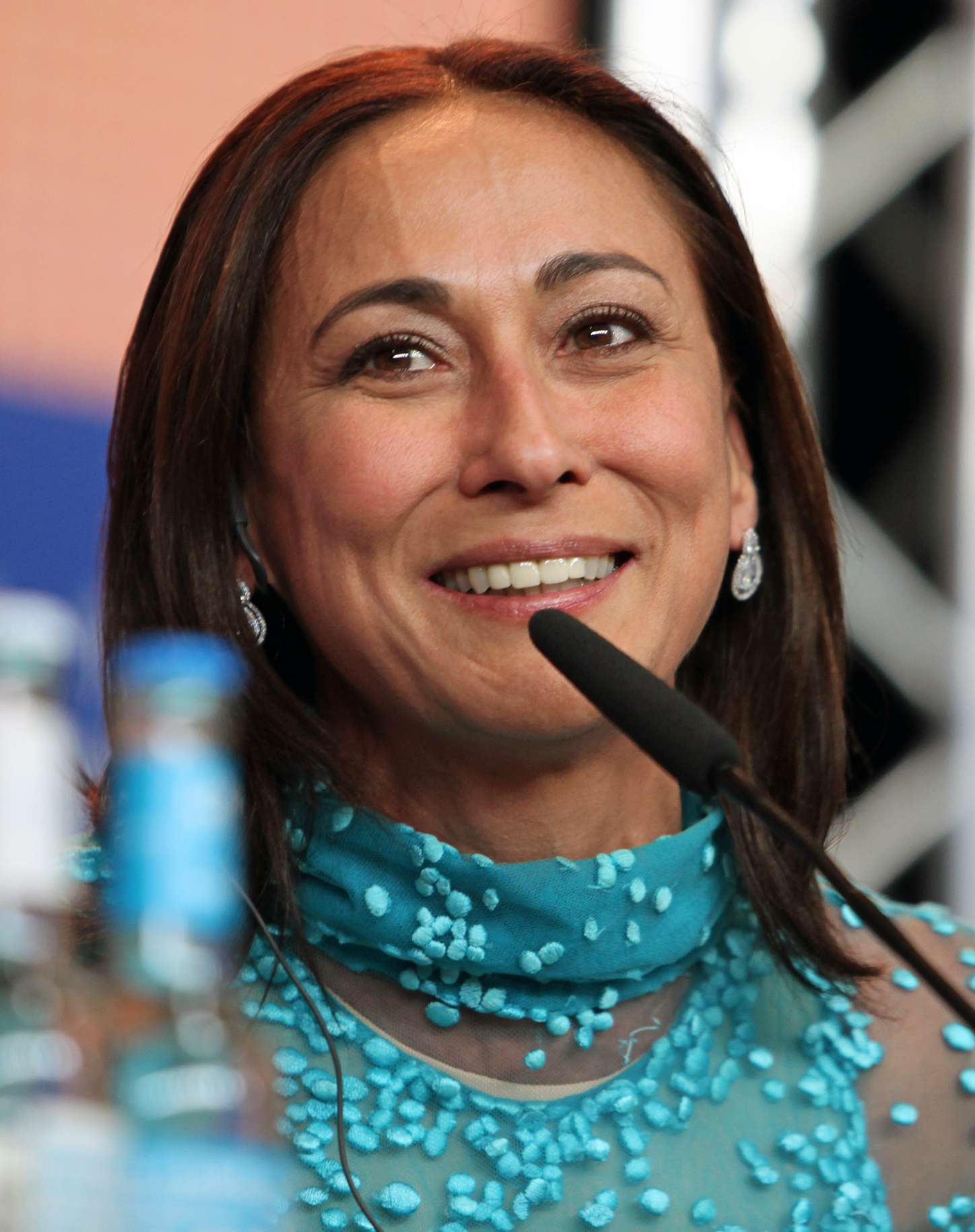
Cherie Gil

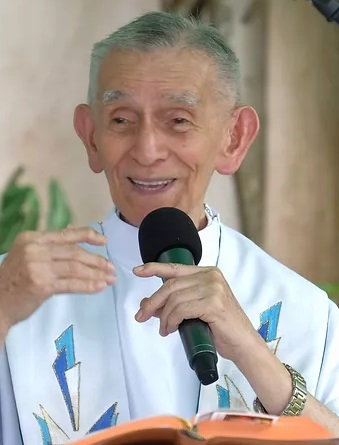
Frederick Kriekenbeek

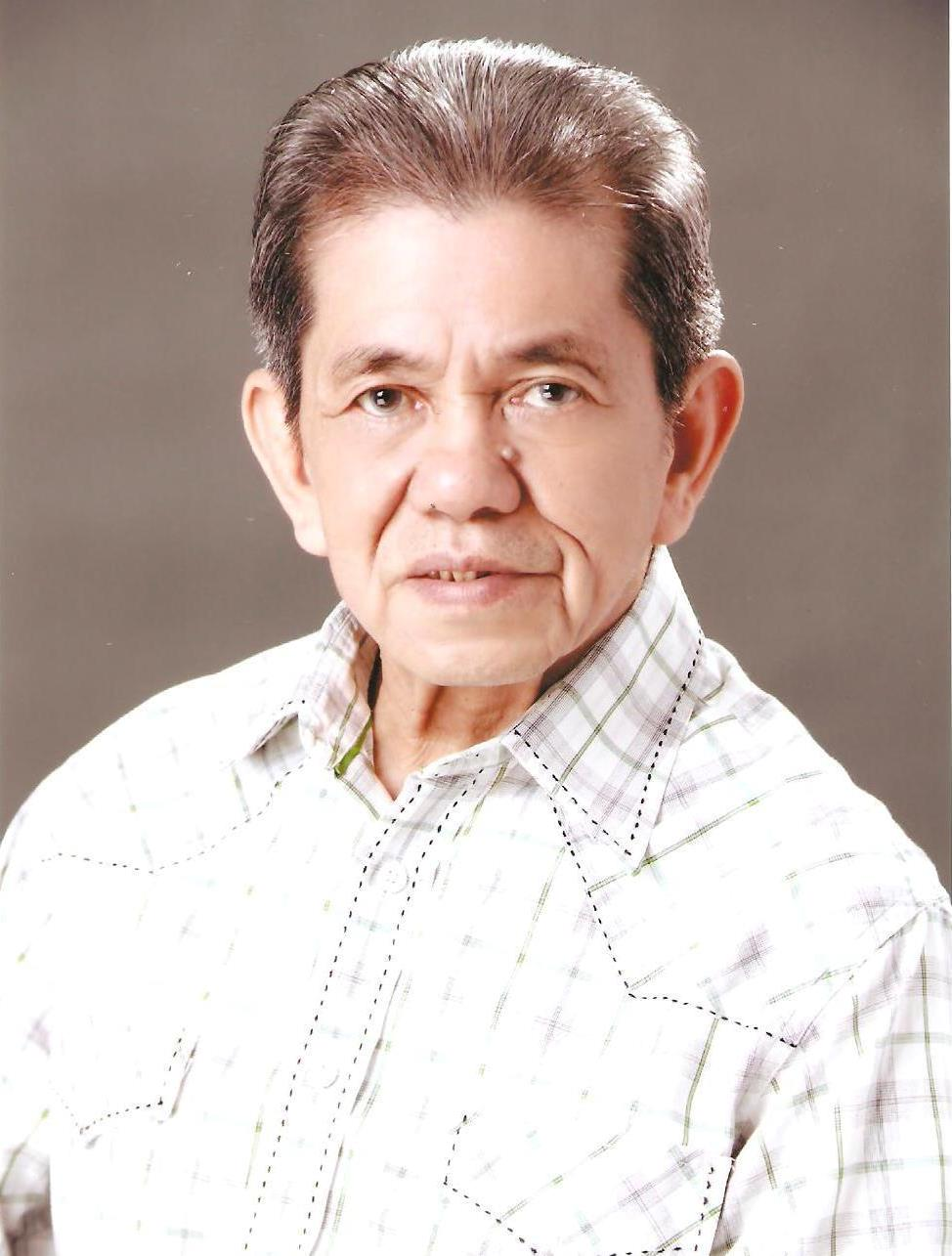
Arthur Angara

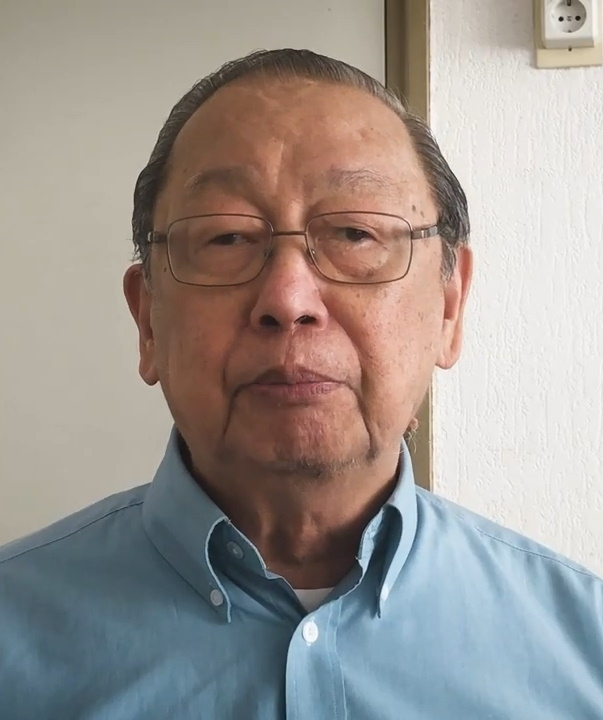
Jose Maria Sison

=== January ===
- January 2 – Rudy Fernandez (b. 1949), triathlete
- January 6:
  - F. Sionil Jose (b. 1924), writer and National Artist for Literature
  - Samuel K. Tan (b. 1933), former chairperson and executive director of the National Historical Institute
  - Maria Victoria Carpio-Bernido (b. 1961), 2010 Ramon Magsaysay Award recipient
- January 14 – Maoi Roca (b. 1975), basketball player and actor
- January 18 – Ernesto "Don Pepot" Fajardo (b. 1933), comedian
- January 23 – Roberto Romulo (b. 1938), former Secretary of Foreign Affairs (1992–1995)

=== February ===
- February 2 – Rustica Carpio (b. 1930), actress and playwright
- February 15 – Dong Puno (b. 1946), Press Secretary (2000–2001) and broadcaster
- February 18 – Ambalang Ausalin (b. 1943), master weaver in Lamitan, Basilan
- February 20 – Jose Fabian Cadiz (b. 1961), former vice mayor of Marikina

=== March ===
- March 5 – Luz Fernandez (b. 1935), actress
- March 13 – Antonio Nachura (b. 1941), former Associate Justice of the Supreme Court
- March 17 – Bobby Nalzaro (b. 1963), broadcaster
- March 22 – Eva Castillo (b. 1969), singer
- March 25 – Keith Martin (b. 1966), singer
- March 29 – Jun Lopito (b. 1958), guitarist

=== April ===
- April 7 – Carlos Salazar (b. 1930), actor and singer
- April 16:
  - Boyet Sison (b. 1963), TV host and sports personality
  - Gloria Sevilla (b. 1932), actress
- April 19 – Jose Santiago "Chito" Sta. Romana (b. 1948), former Philippine ambassador to China
- April 29 – Marisol Panotes (b. 1946), representative of Camarines Norte's 2nd congressional district

=== May ===
- May 5 – Regina Reyes Mandanas (b. 1964), former representative of Marinduque's at-large congressional district (2013–2016)
- May 20 – Susan Roces (b. 1941), actress

=== June ===
- June 8 – Carmen Pedrosa (b. 1941), former director of Philippine Amusement and Gaming Corporation
- June 9 – Mark Shandii Bacolod, (b. 1984), director, producer and talent manager
- June 30 – Rolando Andaya Jr. (b. 1969), former representative of Camarines Sur

=== July ===
- July 8 – Angel Lagdameo (b. 1940), Archbishop of Jaro
- July 23 – Boy Alano (b. 1941), actor
- July 31 – Fidel V. Ramos (b. 1928), 12th President of the Philippines (1992–98)

=== August ===
- August 5 – Cherie Gil (b. 1963), actress
- August 10 – Lydia de Vega (b. 1964), sprinter
- August 22:
  - Benito Tiamzon (b. 1951), communist leader (Death was confirmed in December)
  - Wilma Tiamzon (b. 1952), communist leader (Death was confirmed in December)
- August 23 – Andrew Fernando (b. 1970), singer and stage performer

=== September ===
- September 10 – Joseph Amangi Nacua (b. 1945), bishop of Ilagan (2008–17)
- September 26 – Frederick Kriekenbeek (b. 1932), exorcist priest and founding member of the Roman Catholic Archdiocese of Cebu–Office of Deliverance and Exorcism

=== October ===
- October 3:
  - Percival "Percy Lapid" Mabasa (b. 1959), broadcaster and columnist
  - Mon Legaspi (b. 1968), bassist for The Dawn and Wolfgang
- October 31 – Danny Javier (b. 1947), singer-songwriter and member of APO Hiking Society

=== November ===
- November 16 – Arthur Angara (b. 1937), politician and former mayor of Baler, Aurora (1992–2001, 2004–13)
- November 19 – Flora Gasser (b. 1932), actress
- November 27:
  - Nila Aguillo (b. 1949), former mayor of Cabuyao, Laguna (2004–07)
  - Rene M. Alviar (b. 1948), journalist
- November 30 – Calixto Cataquiz (b. 1948), former mayor of San Pedro, Laguna (1986–98; 2007–13)

=== December ===
- December 1 – Sylvia La Torre (b. 1933), singer and actress
- December 9 – Jovit Baldivino (b. 1993), singer
- December 16 – Jose Maria Sison (b. 1939), founder of Communist Party of the Philippines

== See also ==
=== Country overviews ===
- Philippines
- History of the Philippines
- History of the Philippines (1986–present)
- Outline of the Philippines
- Government of the Philippines
- Politics of the Philippines
- List of years in the Philippines
- Timeline of Philippine history

=== Related timelines for current period ===
- 2022
- 2022 in politics and government
- 2020s
