= 2022 Samar boat explosion =

- Part of the New People's Army rebellion
Date	August 21, 2022
Location	Waters off Catbalogan, Samar, Philippines 11°52′43.3″N 124°41′30.5″E
Result	Deaths of ten Communist rebels CPP-NPA and Philippine government procided conflicting information regarding the circumstance of the deaths.

Belligerents
New People's Army	Philippines

Commanders and leaders
Benito Tiamzon †; Wilma Tiamzon †	Edgardo de Leon

Units involved
Central Committee	Philippine Army: 8th Infantry Division

Casualties and losses
10 killed	

In August 2022, a motorboat carrying rebels of the New People's Army (NPA) exploded in Catbalogan, Samar, Philippines. The explosion killed the passengers, including NPA leaders Benito and Wilma Tiamzon.

== Background ==
=== Communist rebellion ===
The triumvirate of the Communist Party of the Philippines, New People's Army, and the National Democratic Front (CPP-NPA-NDF) has been waging a rebellion against the Philippine government for decades.

Under the administration of President Rodrigo Duterte, the Philippine government has engaged with peace talks with the CPP-NPA-NDF. Duterte would formally halt the peace talks in 2017 after both sides accused one another of repeated ceasefire violations.

The Anti-Terrorism Council of the Philippine government has designated the CPP-NPA as a terrorist groups in December 2020. The same designation was placed for the NDF in June 2021.

=== Tiamzon couple ===
The casualties of the Samar boat explosion included NPA leaders Benito and Wilma Tiamzon who were originally arrested in March 22, 2014. They were released in August 2016 on bail, to participate in peace talks to end the Communist rebellion in the Philippines in Oslo, Norway representing the Communist rebels as consultants of the National Democratic Front.

Having existing arrest warrants for various crimes, they went to hiding again after peace talks collapsed in 2017. They would be tried in absentia for the kidnapping of four Army lieutenants in 1988. They were sentenced to prison in November 2020.

The couple themselves would also be considered as terrorists by the Anti-Terrorism Council.

== Explosion ==
A motorboat carrying ten members of the New People's Army (NPA) exploded on August 21, 2022 off the waters of Catbalogan, Samar. There is conflicting information regarding to the circumstances leading to the explosion from both the Philippine military and the Communist rebels.

=== Philippine government account ===
The Armed Forces of the Philippines' Joint Task Force (JTF) Storm received information from a tipster of a potential movement of ten armed individuals by motorboat loaded with suspected explosives. They dispatched Special Forces to approach the boat with passengers then-suspected be affiliated with the New People's Army. The incident occurred at around 4:20–25 a.m. within the vicinity of Calbayog towards Buri island which is under Catbalogan. The boat is noted to be "far" with its general direction being "offshore".

The troops advised the passengers to submit themselves for an inspection through a megaphone. However the passengers reportedly refused to the demand and opened fire on the army personnels. Gunfight between the two groups lead to the explosion of the motorboat carrying the suspected rebels leading to their presumed deaths.

According to the tip the boat passengers loaded boxes on their watercraft in Samar island proper and left for Canhawan Guti island off the coast of Catbalogan.

The Army was unable to immediately retrieve physical evidence confirming the deaths of its passengers, which was believed to include CPP-NPA figures Benito and Wilma Tiamzon.

=== CPP-NPA account ===
The Communist Party of the Philippines (CPP) would release their own account of what transpired in Samar months later on April 20, 2023 as per internal reports of their own Central Committee. They say that the Tiamzons along with eight other members of the central headquarters' guerilla force were captured by the military while riding separated vehicles. They alleged they were subjected to beatings before being killed by the Armed Forces of the Philippines (AFP). The communist group states that the capture occurred on August 21, 2022 before their remains were disposed off on the boat early morning of the following day.

According to the CPP, the encounter at sea was a cover-up by the AFP and its US military advisers for their "fascist crime". The rebel group believes that the corpse of their ten members including the Tiamzons were loaded into a motorboat filled with explosives which was later detonated to dispose of them.

== Response ==
=== Confirmations ===
The Armed Forces of the Philippines' Joint Task Force Storm shortly after the explosion, conducted search operations to retrieved the bodies of the boat's passengers. They were unable to do so including confirming that the Tiamzons were among the passengers. They were able to retrieve eight cadavers but were unable to ascertain their identities.

The National Intelligence Coordinating Agency would confirmed the couple's death in December 2022 based on intelligence reports and statements from their former comrades.

=== Reactions ===
Relatives of the Tiamzons in September 2022, reportedly sought the Commission on Human Rights to determine the whereabouts of Benito and Wilma Tiamzon.

Following their confirmation of the incident in April 2023, the CPP–NPA instructed its fighters to honor the Tiamzons during the 50th founding anniversary of the National Democratic Front of the Philippines through a 21-gun salute.

National Security Council director general Eduardo Año welcomed the CPP's confirmation of the Tiamzons' death while dismissed the rebel group's accounts as a fabrication by the "CPP's propaganda machinery". He believes with the death of its prominent leader Jose Maria Sison in December 2022 and the Tiamzons in August 2022 that the Communist rebellion is left with "no direction or future".
