= 2017 Bank of the Philippine Islands systems glitch =

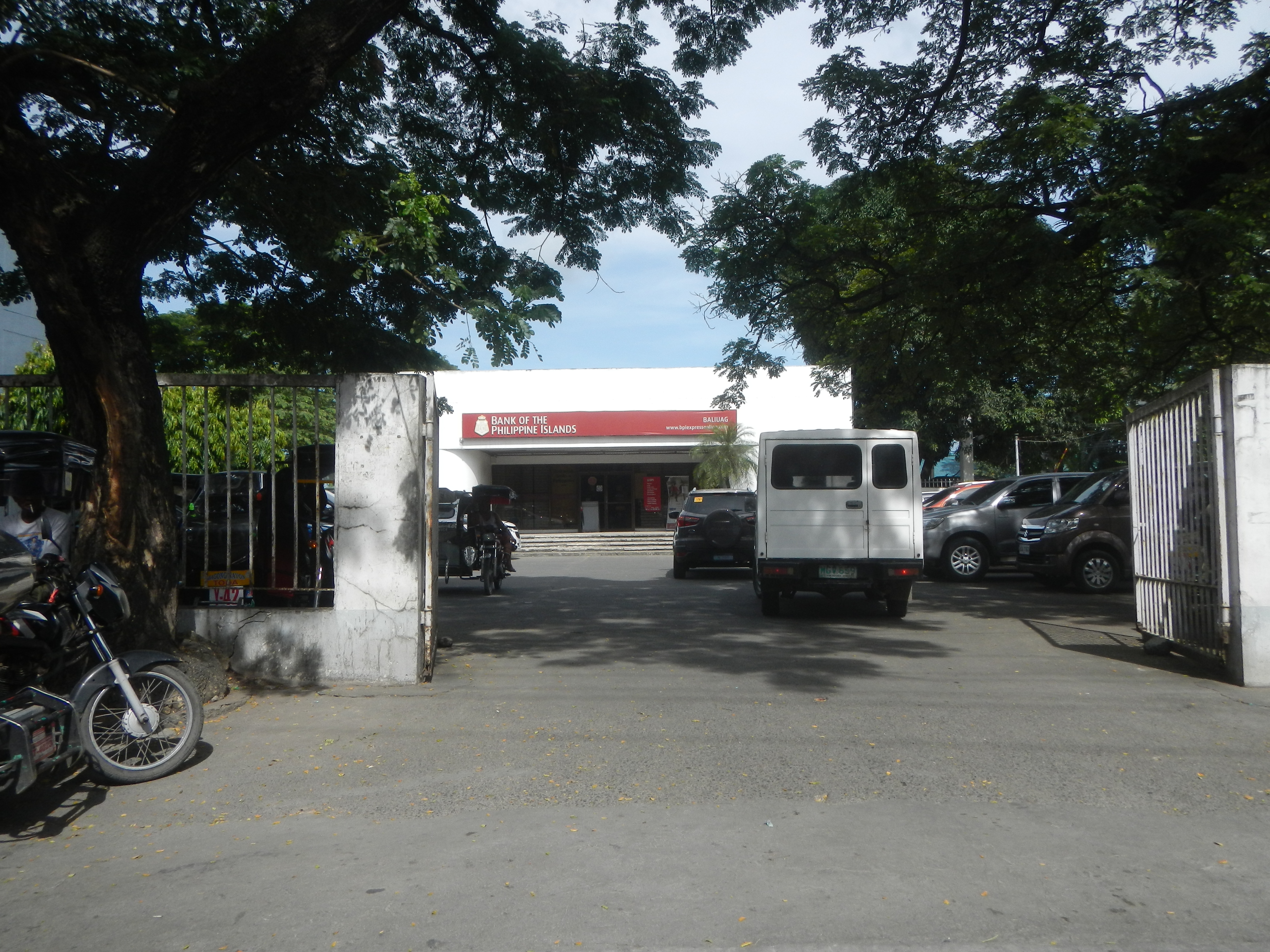
- One of the BPI branches located at Baliuag, Bulacan
- Date: June 6–8, 2017
- Location: Philippines (nationwide)
- Type: Systems glitch

On June 7, 2017, the Bank of the Philippine Islands (BPI) suspended its online transaction and automatic teller machine services amidst reports of money missing from its account holders. There was speculation that BPI was compromised by hackers but the bank claimed that the problem was caused by an internal data processing error. The scope of the issue was nationwide according to the bank and also said that only a small portion of its customers were affected and that most of them were in Metro Manila.

It was reported that the value of some transactions made from April 27 to May 3, 2017, were doubled. The bank issued a statement that they were resolving the issue and assured that its clients would not lose any money.

BPI's stocks in the Philippine Stock Exchange remained unaffected in response to the incident. Luis Limlingan, head of research and sales at Regina Capital Development Corporation viewed that most investors could have seen the incident as a one-off event that could be resolved. According to Limlingan the real problem was how BPI dealt with its disgruntled customers.

BPI announced that they resolved the issue at 9 p.m. on June 8, 2017. The Bangko Sentral ng Pilipinas, the country's central bank, launched a probe on the incident.

== See also ==
- 2012 RBS Group computer system problems
- 2021 Banco de Oro hack
