= Living the Gospel Community =

Religious institute of women founded in the Philippines

- Communitas Vivendi Evangelii
- Abbreviation: L.G.C.
- Nickname: LGC Sisters
- Formation: 8 September 1974; 52 years ago
- Founder: Msgr. Frederick Kriekenbeek
- Founded at: Cebu City, Philippines
- Headquarters: LGC Motherhouse, Mantalongon, Barili, Cebu 6036, Philippines
- Members: 77 as of 2022
- Countries present: Philippines; Australia
- Head Servant: Sis. Marife Leslie Luna, LGC
- Apostolate: Pastoral Care, Catholic Formation, Parish Administration, Foreign Mission and other Church needs.
- Parent organization: Roman Catholic Church

The Living the Gospel Community (Latin: Communitas Vivendi Evangelii), abbreviated L.G.C. is a Catholic female religious institute of diocesan right based in Cebu City, Philippines. It was founded by Msgr. Frederick Kriekenbeek on 8 September 1974, in honor of the Nativity of the Blessed Virgin Mary with the intention of glorifying God through the renewal of His people.

== Charism ==
The LGC Sisters are identified by their unique charism rooted on "the renewal of God's people in all walks of life and to bring about the fullness of man for the glory of God."

== Mission ==
The LGC Sisters deliberately offer themselves to the following mission as stated in their General Constitutions:

"Nourished by the Word of God and the Eucharist, united among ourselves and with the Church, transformed by the Spirit with Mary in love, we the members of the Living the Gospel Community commit ourselves to a life of constant renewal in Jesus Christ and the extension of His Kingdom by small communities."

Currently, the congregation has 21 communities in the Philippines (in the dioceses of Borongan, Cebu, Davao, Maasin, Mati, Parañaque, Surigao, Tandag, and Zamboanga) and one missionary community in Australia (in the archdiocese of Sydney).

=== Apostolates and ministries ===
The LGC Sisters are engaged in various established apostolates and ministries such as pastoral care to students, parents, prisoners and families of overseas workers; Catholic and value formation which involves catechism in parishes and schools and giving retreats; administering retreat houses, parish offices and nursing homes for the elderly and orphans; livelihood assistance to the poor to upgrade their quality of life; and responding to other Church necessities wherever they are requested by their respective bishops who invited them.

== Notable members ==
- Sis. Maria Visminda Dumadag, LGC, recipient of Pro Ecclesia et Pontifice for her outstanding service to the Catholic Church.
