= Frederick Kriekenbeek =

Filipino Roman Catholic priest (1932–2022)

Msgr Frederick Kriekenbeek H.P.
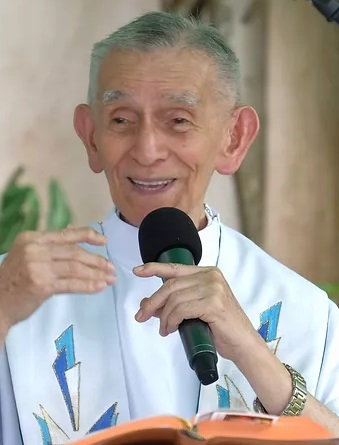
- Kriekenbeek in 2020

Orders
- Ordination: 2 February 1961 by Richard Cardinal Cushing

Personal details
- Born: 12 April 1932 Cabanatuan, Nueva Ecija, Philippine Islands
- Died: 26 September 2022 (aged 90) Lahug, Cebu, Philippines
- Buried: LGC Mother House Chapel, Mantalongon, Barili, Cebu
- Denomination: Roman Catholic
- Occupation: Priest, founder, exorcist

Frederick Kriekenbeek (12 April 1932 – 26 September 2022) was a Filipino Catholic priest and pioneering exorcist in the Archdiocese of Cebu.

== Biography ==
Kriekenbeek was born on 12 April 1932 to a Filipino mother and a British father from Ceylon. During his younger years, he was a scholar at Harvard Law School which he set aside and chose the call to the priestly life and ministry. He was ordained priest on 2 February 1961 at St. John's Seminary, Massachusetts.

Returning to the Philippines, he served in the many parishes and various ministries of the Archdiocese of Cebu, and led many faith communities such as the Legion of Mary and Catholic Charismatic Renewal. He later founded religious congregations: the Living the Gospel Community (LGC) in 1974, the Mary's Little Children Community (MLCC) in 1998, the Mary Queen of Heaven Missionaries (MQHM) in 2003, the Mary's Immaculate Heart Missionaries (MIHM) in 2020, and became one of the initiators of the Mission Society of the Philippines (MSP).

During the time of Cardinal Ricardo Vidal, he was given authority to conduct exorcisms. But while Kriekenbeek then served as an exorcist for the Archdiocese, his position was never formalized. In 2019, Kriekenbeek, along with six priests and a layman, were appointed by Vidal's successor, Archbishop Jose Palma, as the founding members of the Archdiocese of Cebu Office of Deliverance and Exorcism (ACODE), whose task is to address reported demonic possessions in Cebu.

Kriekenbeek died in Lahug, Cebu, Philippines, on 26 September 2022, at the age of 90. He was regarded by the Cebuano clergy and politicians as a "holy man" and "humble servant of God."

== Publications ==
- Jose Maria De Nazareno, Frederick Kriekenbeek at God’s Beck and Call (St. Paul Philippines, 2010)
