= Tarantadong Kalbo =

Filipino comic strip cartoonist (born 1985)

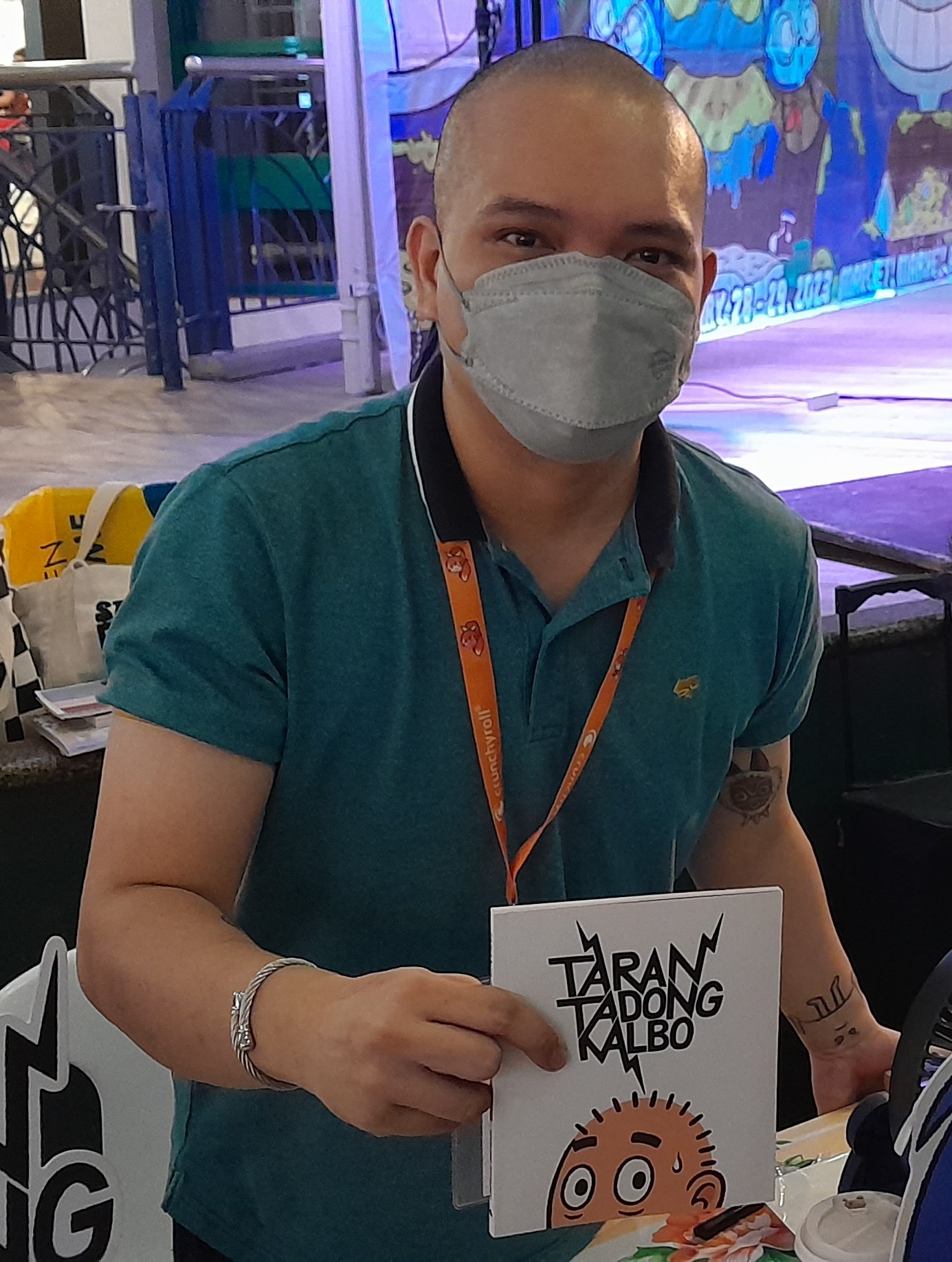
- Tarantadong Kalbo during a comic book fair at Market! Market!, January 2023
- Born: Kevin Eric Raymundo; September 18, 1985 (age 40)
- Education: Asian College of Science and Technology (dropped out)
- Known for: Comic strip
- Notable work: Tarantadong Kalbo comics; Tumindig
- Awards: Good Design Awards; 2025 Tumindig – Media/Content

Instagram information
- Page: tarantadongkalbo
- Genres: Art; Comedy; Politics
- Followers: 101 thousand

Kevin Eric Raymundo, more commonly known by the pseudonym Tarantadong Kalbo or TK, is a Filipino comic strip cartoonist.

== Early life and education ==
Kevin Eric Raymundo was born on September 18, 1985. Raymundo attests he started drawing at five years old. He attended the Asian College of Science and Technology in Quezon City but dropped out due to financial reasons. He then took up some training in animation.

== Comics career ==
Kevin Eric Raymundo is a freelance animator who initially drew comics as hobby. Raymundo began drawing the Tarantadong Kalbo slice of life comic strips in July 2019 initially posting it on Facebook. Raymundo gained a following and soon branched to Twitter and Instagram.

He planned to publish the work but his work prevented him to do so. Komiket, a Filipino independent convention by Paolo Herras, approached him leading to the publication of Tarantadong Kalbo Vol. 1. THe name of the comics and Raymundo became synonymous.

In 2021, Raymundo created Tumindig to mobilize voters for the 2022 Philippine presidential election and as a critique against the administration of President Rodrigo Duterte. It was recognized at 2022 the Good Design Awards by the Japan Institute of Design Promotion.

In 2023, Raymundo spoke at Graphika Manila discussing his creative process and works.

== Animation career ==
As an animator, Raymundo was involved in Tom & Jerry, Curious George, Jonny Quest, and Eliot Kid. For local animation works its Heneral Tuna and Netflix feature film Hayop Ka!

== Works ==
=== Tarantadong Kalbo ===
Tarantadong Kalbo is a slice of life comics. The protagonist is based on Raymundo himself who has a shaved head. The topic ranges from daily life, reference to popular culture, and commentary on social issues. It also incorporates Raymundo's political views as well. His art style was inspired from illustrations used by Gorillaz as well as classic Filipino comics.

Tarantadong Kalbo Vol. 1 is the franchise's first print publication and mostly tackles Raymundo's experiences during the COVID-19 pandemic in 2020.

A spinoff series, named Baby TK was released in 2023 which is inspired from his experiences in early childhood.

=== Tumindig ===
He published the Tumindig artwork which later become his other best known work. He deconstructed the fist bump gesture associated with the supporters of President Rodrigo Duterte with Tumindig also serving as a call to action to vote in the 2022 Philippine presidential election. The common themes of his work includes social issues and Filipino culture.

=== Other works ===
In late 2020, Raymundo collaborated with the Foundation for Media Alternatives to produce a strip entitled Inuman Sessions: Fake News which tackles misinformation, fake news and red-tagging.

He collaborated with the IBON Foundation in 2024 to design the organization's 2025 planner which had the theme of "imperialism" which critique both American and Chinese imperialism.

== Political views ==
Raymundo insist that he does not create art for the sake of aesthetics and that art is always political. He views himself as an artist-activist. He has opposed red-tagging in the Philippines which he has been subjected to, as well as the Anti-Terrorism Act of 2020.

== Personal life ==
Raymundo looks up to fellow cartoonists Manix Abrera, Toto Madayag, Mervin Malonzo and Pol Medina Jr.. He is based in Cainta and is a married man.

In October 2025, Tarantadong Kalbo was rushed into the hospital for transient ischemic attack. He is reportedly recovering.
