= Ungkaya Pukan clash =

2022 Philippine gunfight with MILF

- Part of the Aftermath of the Moro conflict
Date	November 8–10, 2022
Location	Ungkaya Pukan, Basilan, Philippines
Result	Ceasefire

Belligerents
Philippines	Moro Islamic Liberation Front "Lawless elements"

Commanders and leaders
(Philippines) Domingo Gobway (Philippines) John Ferdinand Lazo	Huram Malangka

Units involved
Philippine Army: 64th Infantry Battalion; 18th Infantry Battalion	Bangsamoro Islamic Armed Forces: 114th Base Command

Strength
Undisclosed	~100

Casualties and losses
3 killed 15 injured	4 killed

On November 8, 2022, the Philippine Army and the Moro Islamic Liberation Front (MILF) engaged in a gunfight in Ungkaya Pukan, Basilan, while the army was conducting clearing operations on "lawless elements" allegedly taking refuge in the territory controlled by the MILF. Fighting between the two sides continued until November 10, 2022 when a ceasefire between two sides were signed.

== Background ==
In September 2022, Philippine government authorities requested the 114th Base Command of the Moro Islamic Liberation Front (MILF) Bangsamoro Islamic Armed Forces (BIAF) led by Commander Huram Malangka to temporarily vacate their area in Barangay Ulitan, Ungkaya Pukan, Basilan in order to pursue what they call "lawless elements" which took refuge. After a month, the kin of MILF returned to the area but not Malangka himself and his armed rebels. The Philippine Army has been conducting clearing operations in barangays Ulitan, Baguindan and Tipo-Tipo in pursuit of these people. The military in the area is led by Brigadier General Domingo Gobway, commander of the 101st Infantry Brigade who also heads the Joint Task Force (JTF) Basilan.

The "lawless elements" were linked to May 30 Isabela bombing which injured two civilians, and the June 20 Lamitan city hall bombing and were alleged to be manufacturing improvised explosive devices. The MILF was also accused of coddling them after the "lawless elements" pursued in an operation in Baguindan moved to Ulitan.

On November 7, the MILF sent a letter of coordination to them thru the Coordinating Committee on the Cessation of Hostilities (CCCH), which informed the military of their intent to return to Ulitan. Commander Gobway delegated Lt. Col. John Ferdinand Lazo, the commanding officer of the 64th Infantry Battalion to coordinate with the MILF 114th Base Command and inform them they could return to Ulitan in the condition that they don't bring any firearms with them. This is because that the military is conducting a program in the area and the no firearms measure is to mitigate rido or inter-clan armed conflict. However, the military learned that the MILF has already returned to Ulitan in the evening of that same day, bringing with them firearms. Lazo approached the group on November 8, 2022 but the situation devolved into a gunfight between the two sides.

The MILF and the Philippine government signed the Comprehensive Agreement on the Bangsamoro (CAB), a peace deal in 2014 where the rebel group agreed to undergo disarmament and give up its goal for secession in exchange for the establishment of a new autonomous region. The Bangsamoro region was established in 2019, with its transition government headed by MILF officials. The clash is seen as detrimental to the 2014 deal and the overall peace process.

== Clashes ==
Fighting between the 64th Infantry Battalion (IB) of the Philippine Army and the 114th Base Command of the MILF–BIAF began at around 12:25pm on November 8, 2022. 64th IB commanding officer Col. John Ferdinand Lazo came in the morning to coordinate with MILF commander Huram Malangka but the rebel leader refused to engage talks with him. Tensions worsened when one of Lazo's personnel was hit by a sniper, who survived due to wearing a Kevlar vest. Conflict ensues when the soldiers fought back in response to the sniper attack.

The MILF provided reinforcements and by November 9, the military estimates that they have 100 fighters on their side allegedly including from "lawless elements". Shooting subsided on that day, but conflict resumed morning of November 10.

A ceasefire was signed between the Philippine government, represented by the Office of the Presidential Adviser on Peace, Reconciliation and Unity, and the MILF was signed at 4:00pm on November 10, 2022.

The skirmishes resulted to the Philippine military losing three soldiers and the wounding of at least 15 personnel. All three soldiers killed hailed from the 18th Infantry Battalion. 4 MILF rebels died.

== Reactions ==
Basilan Representative Mujiv Hataman on November 9 appealed for a ceasefire between both sides of the skirmish and demanded reasons why conflict arose despite a prior peace deal. Mohagher Iqbal, MILF peace implementing peace chair, labeled the incident as "unfortunate" and reiterate his side's commitment to implement the 2014 peace deal.

== Aftermath ==
The ceasefire signed between the Philippine government and the MILF on November 10, 2022 was brokered by Coordinating Committee on the Cessation of Hostilities (CCCH) and Ad Hoc Joint Action Group (AHJAG), and the Non-Violent Peace Force (NVFP) of both sides. The ceasefire deal has five key points:

- Immediate ceasefire between the troops and the group of Commander Huram Malangka of the 114th Based Command of the Bangsamoro Islamic Armed Forces-MILF.
- Immediate pullout of the reinforcements of the BIAF-MILF who are not residents of Barangay Ulitan, Ungkaya Pukan.
- Allow the return of the group of Commander Malangka, who are residents of Barangay Ulitan, provided that their firearms are kept within their respective houses as they wait for their decommissioning. BIAF-MILF residents of Barangay Ulitan should be properly identified and registered.
- Establish a composite detachment which shall be composed of soldiers, policemen and BIAF-MILF, who will jointly cooperate to address the lawless elements and help in the maintenance of peace and order in Barangay Ulitan.
- Issues and concerns pertaining to the BIAF-MILF in Ungkaya Pukan town should be immediately reported to the GPH-MILF CCCH and AHJAG for immediate resolution.

It was found out that both sides were fed misinformation. The MILF received reports that Philippine soldiers slain a pig inside their Madrasa which angered the rebels while the military received alleged information that the MILF seized a tank and beheaded four soldiers. Both sides denied the reports. The MILF said that sniper which shot a Filipino soldier was not a member. It was speculated that the sniper belongs to a third party, probably part of the "lawless elements" the Philippine military was pursuing.

The families of the seven killed MILF members were provided financial aid as compensation. No charges were filed against the MILF for the deaths of three soldiers as a bid to prevent further escalation of tension between the two parties..
