= Tumindig =

Digital artwork

- Artist: Kevin Eric Raymundo (Tarantadong Kalbo)
- Completion date: July 17, 2021
- Medium: Digital
- Dimensions: 1200 x 1200 pixels
- Website: www.tumindig.ph (archived)

Tumindig (lit. 'Arise') is a digital artwork by Kevin Eric Raymundo also known as Tarantadong Kalbo. It also refers to a movement which resulted from the original artwork.

== Background ==
The original Tumindig artwork was created by Filipino satirist and cartoonist Kevin Eric Raymundo. Raymundo is known for his web comic series Tarantadong Kalbo which has been running for two years at the time of Tumindig's release. He is also known by the name of his comic series.

The original illustration was published on July 17, 2021, and was posted in Facebook, Twitter, and Instagram.

Raymundo said he created the digital artwork out of frustration over the Philippine government response against the COVID-19 pandemic.

The original artwork depicts rows of blue anthropomorphic fists bowing in submission except for one glowing white raised-fist character. The bowing fists allude to the horizontal fist gesture used by then-President Rodrigo Duterte and his followers.

== Reception ==
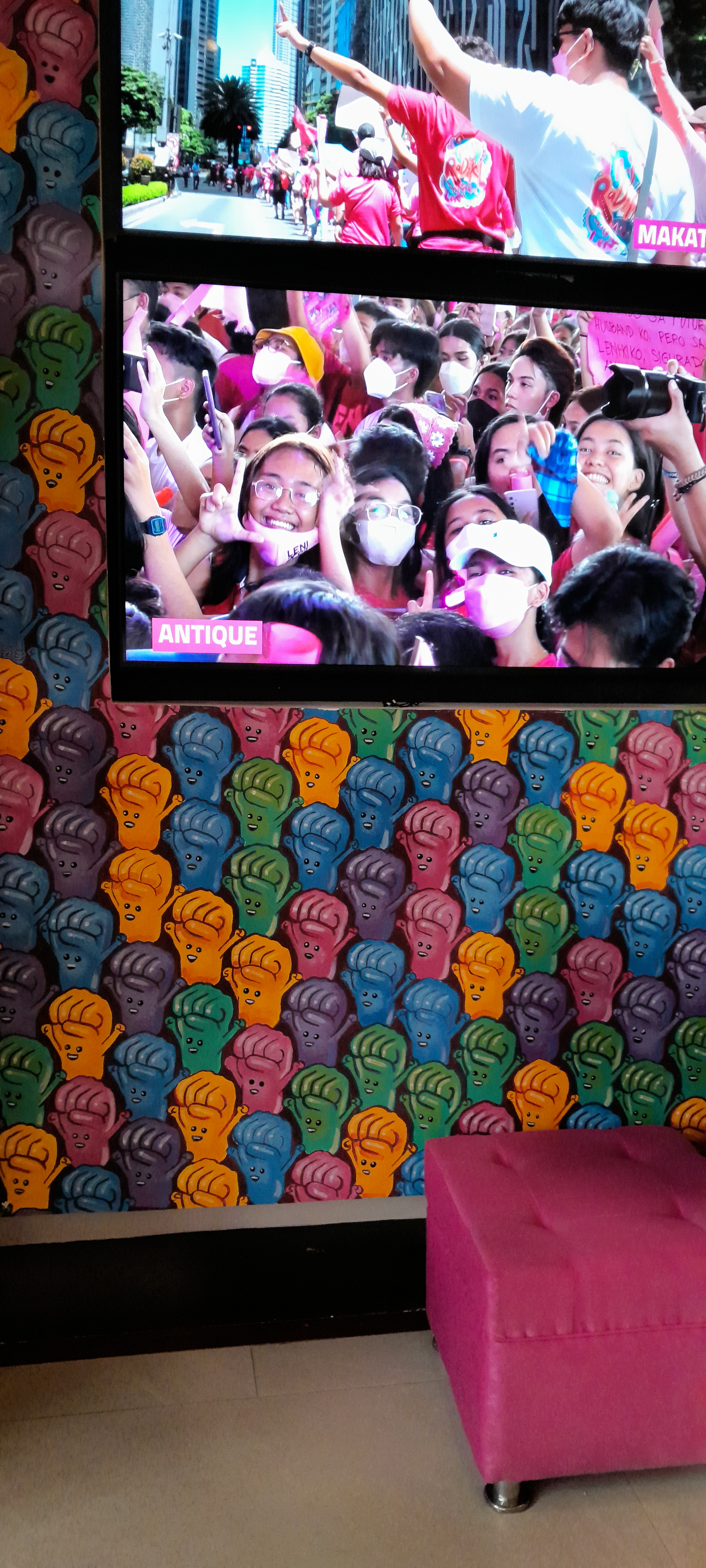
A wall behind TV monitors and a couch at the Museo ng Pag-asa in Quezon City decorated with a repetition of fists from Tumindig. The museum, opened in September 2022, contains artworks, crafts and other items donated by artists and artisans to 2022 presidential candidate Leni Robredo during her campaign. Tarantadong Kalbo, along with other artists, endorsed Robredo.

=== Tumindig movement ===
The original Tumindig artwork started a movement with other artists making derivatives by adding their own raised-fist avatar in solidarity with the sole raised-fist in the original artwork. Raymundo himself made available a blank template of the raised-fist icon to encourage others to create their own avatars.

Raymundo released a website which showcase a version of Tumindig created from a compilation of customized raised-fist icons created by other individuals and groups. It also provides a form where one could submit their own raised-fist avatar so that it could be added to the compilation as well as a link to voter's registration page of the Commission on Election so they would be eligible to vote in the 2022 Philippine general election.

Toy maker Gino Roberto came up with a resin figure of the raised-fist character. With consent from Raymundo he announced that he would be selling copies of the figure with part of the proceeds to be given to the Philippine Animation Workers Association (PAWA).

Other derivative works in other mediums were created from the raised-fist character of Tumindig. The character was also used as effigies and other paraphernalia in protests during the 2021 State of the Nation Address.

=== Critical reception of work ===
On October 7, 2022, Tumindig was recognized at the Good Design Award 2022 of the Japan Institute of Design Promotion under the Contents for the general public category. The institute noted the movement behind the artwork and its derivatives.
