= Wilma Tiamzon =

Philippine politician (1952–2022)

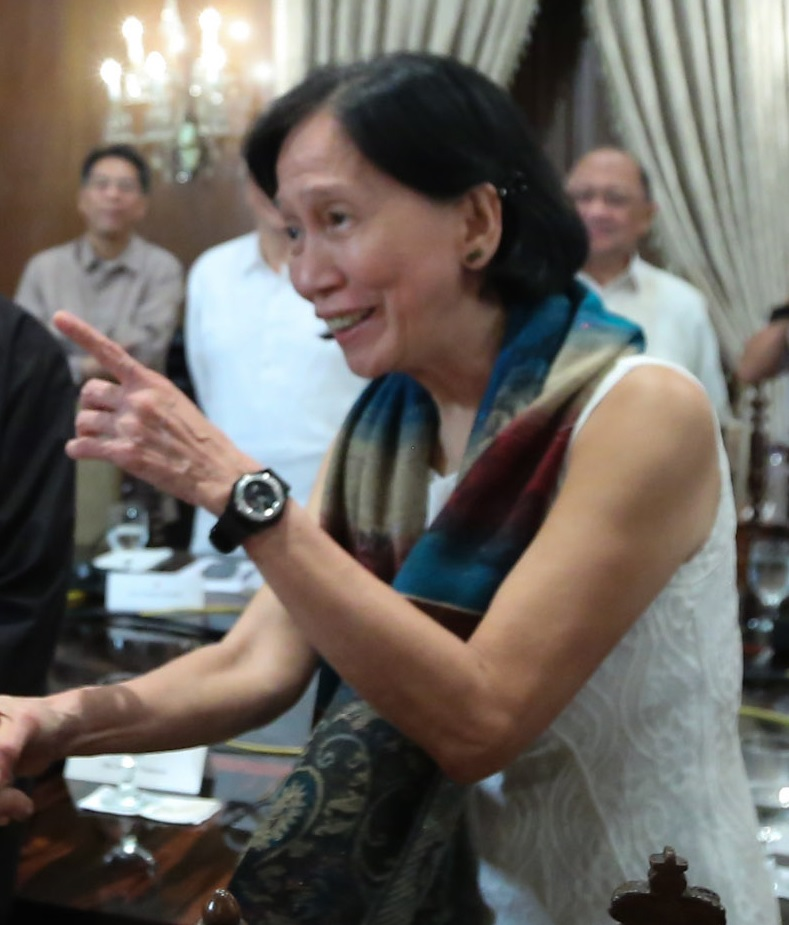
- Tiamzon in 2016
- Born: Wilma Austria; December 21, 1952; Pasig City, Rizal Province (later Metro Manila in 1975), Philippines
- Died: August 22, 2022 (aged 69); Catbalogan City, Samar Province, Philippines
- Cause of death: Explosion
- Education: University of the Philippines Diliman
- Years active: 1968–2022
- Known for: leadership of the Communist Party of the Philippines-New People's Army
- Political party: Communist Party of the Philippines
- Spouse: Benito Tiamzon
- Military career
- Allegiance: New People's Army

Wilma Tiamzon (née Austria; 21 December 1952 – August 22, 2022) was a Filipino political organizer and until her arrest in March 2014 by Philippine security forces, believed to be the Secretary-General of the Communist Party of the Philippines (CPP) and its armed wing, the New People's Army (NPA).

== Early education ==
Tiamzon was a student in the University of the Philippines Diliman during the late 1960s. She was a writer for the Philippine Collegian, the university's student publication.

== Career ==
Tiamzon had previously served as the finance officer and secretary of the CPP's National Peasant Commission and was secretary of the CPP's National Education Department. She had also been a member of the Regional Trade Union Bureau and a member of CPP-NPA central executive committee.

She was arrested in July 1973 during the years following Ferdinand E. Marcos, Sr. declaration of Martial Law in the Philippines. She was released in 1974. She was again arrested in October 1989 for murder charges but escaped from the detention center in Camp Crame two months later. The Philippine military stated that the CPP-NPA spent ₱2.5 million for her escape.

Tiamzon along with her husband, a fellow senior member of the CPP leadership, and five other persons were arrested by Philippine security forces in Cebu in 2014 during the presidency of Benigno Aquino III; they had been exposed by surveillance since relief operations began in the wake of Typhoon Haiyan the year before. Recovered in their possession were firearms, grenades and ammunition. The Tiamzons were wanted on murder charges as a consequence for their alleged involvement in the deaths of fifteen civilians whose remains were discovered in a mass grave in Inopacan, Leyte in 2006. They were released from detention in August 2016 upon the order of President Rodrigo Duterte as they were designated representatives of the National Democratic Front to the peace talks with the Government of the Philippines to be held in Oslo, Norway. Duterte announced that peace negotiations would no longer be undertaken in February 2017 and that he expected the NDF representatives, including the Tiamzons to "on their own… return and go back to prison."

== Death ==
On August 22, 2022, a boat carrying ten NPA rebels exploded in Catbalogan City, Samar Province. According to the Philippine Army approach the boat acting on a tip by locals. The military reportedly advised the passengers to submit themselves for inspection through a megaphone but the passengers allegedly opened fire on the troops before the watercraft exploded. The casualties reportedly include Tiamzon and her husband. The National Intelligence Coordinating Agency confirmed the couple's death in December 2022 based on intelligence reports and statements from their former comrades.

On 20 April 2023, the CPP confirmed the couple's death, stating they were captured and killed by the military rather than a boat explosion. They claimed that the unarmed Tiamzons, along with eight unarmed CPP militants, were captured and subjected to severe beatings by the Armed Forces of the Philippines (AFP). The previously reported mid-sea firefight and explosion, which were believed to have caused their deaths, were, according to the CPP, a cover-up by the AFP and its US military advisers for their "fascist crime". The Tiamzons were considered fugitives and were tagged as "terrorists" by the Anti-Terrorism Council. The CPP demanded justice and their indictment in all relevant courts.

== Personal life ==
Wilma was married to Benito Tiamzon, the Chairman of the CPP-NPA. They had been married since 1973 and had two children, Liza and Alex, and six grandchildren.

== See also ==
- CPP-NPA-NDF rebellion
- Jose Maria Sison
- National Democratic Front
