= Benito Tiamzon =

Philippine political organizer

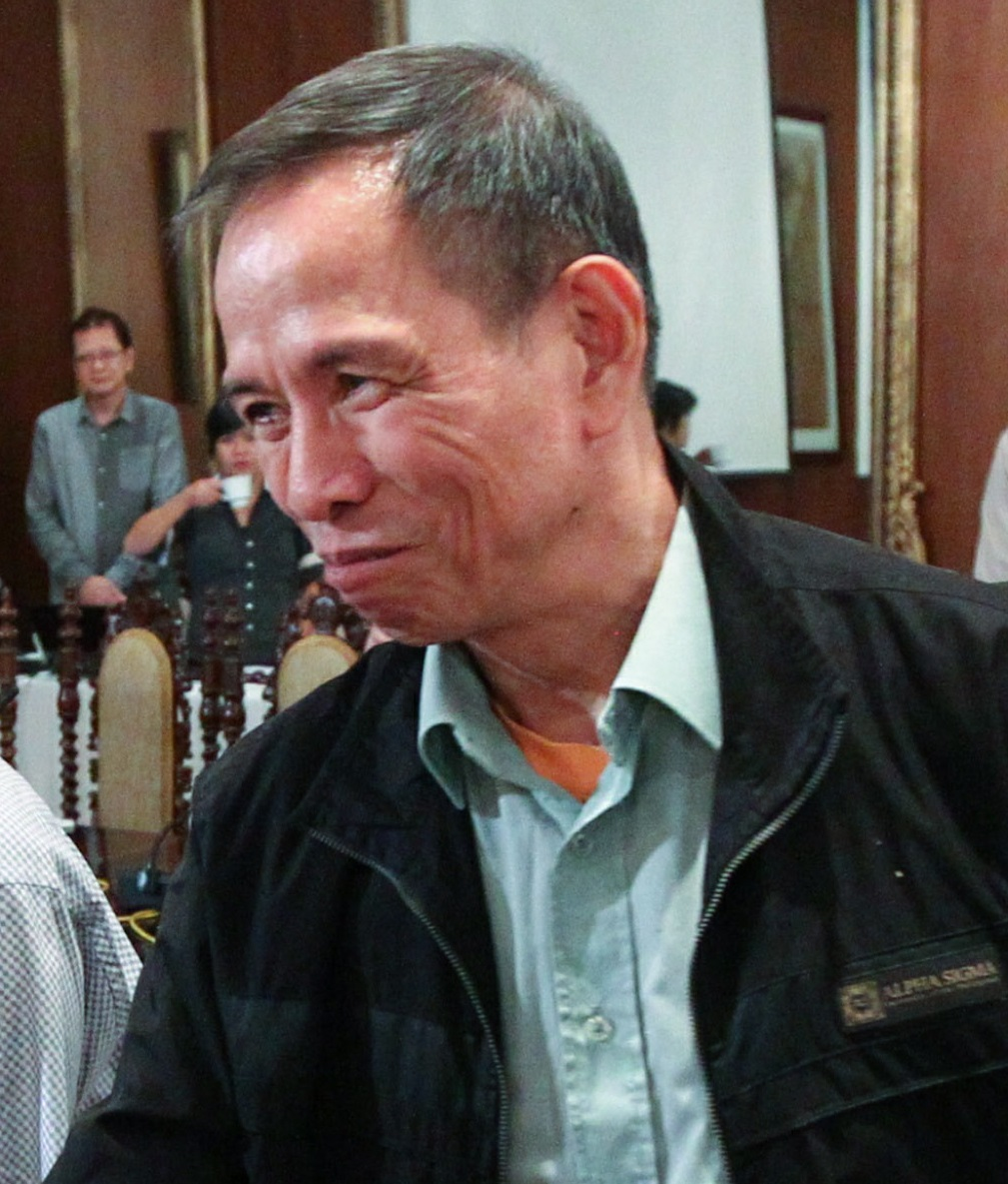
- Born: March 20, 1951; Marikina, Rizal, Philippines
- Died: August 22, 2022 (aged 71); Catbalogan, Samar, Philippines
- Cause of death: Explosion
- Education: University of the Philippines Diliman
- Years active: 1968–2022
- Known for: leadership of the Communist Party of the Philippines-New People's Army
- Political party: Communist Party of the Philippines
- Spouse: Wilma Tiamzon
- Military career
- Allegiance: New People's Army

Benito Tiamzon (March 20, 1951 – August 22, 2022) was a Filipino political organizer and until his arrest in March 2014 by Philippine security forces, was believed to be the Chairman of the Communist Party of the Philippines (CPP) and its armed wing, the New People's Army (NPA).

Born and raised in Marikina, Tiamzon attended the University of the Philippines Diliman beginning in 1969, where he wrote for the Philippine Collegian. Joining the Samahang Demokratiko ng Kabataan (Association of Democratic Youth; SDK) as a student, he would eventually become a member of the CPP, in which he helped organize labor unions in Marikina and Caloocan.

Tiamzon secretly married his fellow activist Wilma Austria in early 1973, but was later arrested and detained in Fort Bonifacio by July during martial law. A year later, he was released and soon after would move with Wilma to the island of Samar in the Eastern Visayas region. In later years, Tiamzon would be credited with transforming Eastern Visayas into a solid base for the NPA in its insurgency movement. During a brief power struggle in the CPP, Tiamzon reportedly became the leader of the party upon successively acquiring the positions of chairman and secretary general in 1986 and 1987 respectively.

In March 2014, Tiamzon and Wilma were captured by both the Armed Forces of the Philippines (AFP) and the Philippine National Police (PNP) in Carcar, Cebu, but they were eventually released from detention in 2016 by President Rodrigo Duterte to participate in peace talks between the government and the National Democratic Front. After peace talks fell through, the couple evaded an order for their rearrest and transferred back to Samar. A boat explosion off the coast of Samar during an AFP Joint Task Force operation on August 22, 2022, is speculated to have resulted in the deaths of Tiamzon and Wilma, but the military refrained from confirming this due to lack of evidence.

== Early life and education ==
Tiamzon was born and raised in Marikina. His parents were both workers in the town's shoemaking industry, and he was the fourth of eight children. According to Manila Times columnist Rigoberto Tiglao, a former head of the Manila-Rizal chapter of the Communist Party of the Philippines (CPP) in the early 1970s, Tiamzon grew up in a family that was neither rich nor poor, and that his family "either had a small business or a farm in Marikina."

Tiamzon graduated as salutatorian from Rizal High School alongside his future spouse Wilma Austria in 1969, and both later enrolled in the University of the Philippines Diliman (UP Diliman). He was a writer for the Philippine Collegian, the university's student publication, and a member of the UP Alpha Sigma Fraternity. He later joined the Samahang Demokratiko ng Kabataan ("Association of Democratic Youth") a progressive group which along with Kabataang Makabayan ("Patriotic Youth") formed the vanguard of the national democratic movement in the Philippines during the presidency of Ferdinand Marcos, especially during his second term.

He earned a Bachelor of Science degree in chemical engineering and a Bachelor of Arts degree in history from UP Diliman.

== Career ==
Tiamzon recalled in an interview with Bulatlat that his efforts for the Leftist movement began when he attended his first demonstration on January 26, 1970 during the State of the Nation Address of President Ferdinand Marcos, which marked the beginning of the First Quarter Storm. He would later organize labor unions for market vendors and workers in Marikina and Caloocan. In 1973, he was arrested after Marcos declared martial law. Detained in Fort Bonifacio, he managed to escape and remained a fugitive until his 2014 arrest.

In the 1970s Tiamzon was sent to Samar to provide "political redirection" for the NPA cadre there. In 1975 he became the Secretary of the CPP's Eastern Visayas Regional Party Committee. In 1976, the CPP issued an organizational document that guided the movement's work in the countryside; Tiamzon was believed to have been responsible for writing most of that document, drawing on his vast experience in Samar. Other former posts include commands of the CPP's Southern Luzon Commission and Sorsogon Regional Mobile Force, and secretary of the CPP's National Commission for Mass Movement. According to the Armed Forces of the Philippines, Tiamzon was involved in many of the CPP's major activities since 1987 when Jose Maria Sison, the CPP's founding chairman, went into exile in the Netherlands. Tiamzon consolidated the CPP in the 1990s after it suffered a split as a consequence of the Second Great Rectification Movement. He formally became the party's Chairman between 2004 and 2008.

Tiamzon along with his spouse, a fellow senior member of the CPP leadership, and five other persons were arrested by Philippine security forces in Cebu in 2014 during the presidency of Benigno Aquino III; they had been exposed by surveillance since relief operations began in the wake of Typhoon Haiyan the year before. Recovered in their possession were firearms, grenades and ammunition. The Tiamzons were wanted on murder charges as a consequence for their alleged involvement in the deaths of fifteen civilians whose remains were discovered in a mass grave in Inopacan, Leyte in 2006. They were released from detention in August 2016 upon the order of President Rodrigo Duterte as they were designated representatives of the National Democratic Front to the peace talks with the Government of the Philippines to be held in Oslo, Norway. Duterte announced that peace negotiations would no longer be undertaken in February 2017 and that he expected the NDF representatives, including the Tiamzons to "on their own… return and go back to prison."

== Death ==
On August 22, 2022, a boat carrying ten NPA rebels exploded in Catbalogan, Samar. According to the Philippine Army, they approached the boat acting on a tip by the locals. The military reportedly advised the passengers to submit themselves for inspection through a megaphone but the passengers allegedly opened fire on the troops before the watercraft exploded. The casualties reportedly include Tiamzon and his wife. The National Intelligence Coordinating Agency confirmed the couple's death in December 2022 based on intelligence reports and statements from their former comrades.

On 20 April 2023, the CPP confirmed the couple's death, stating they were captured and killed by the military rather than a boat explosion. They claimed that the unarmed Tiamzons, along with eight unarmed CPP militants, were captured and subjected to severe beatings by the Armed Forces of the Philippines (AFP). The previously reported mid-sea firefight and explosion, which were believed to have caused their deaths, were, according to the CPP, a cover-up by the AFP and its US military advisers for their "fascist crime". The Tiamzons were considered fugitives and were tagged as "terrorists" by the Anti-Terrorism Council. The CPP demanded justice and their indictment in all relevant courts.

== Personal life ==
Benito was married to Wilma Tiamzon, the Secretary-General of the CPP-NPA. The couple had two children, Liza and Alex, and six grandchildren. Benito allegedly had six toes on one of his feet, a condition known as polydactyly.

== See also ==
- Communist rebellion in the Philippines
- Jose Maria Sison
- National Democratic Front
