= PCNHS =

PCNHS may refer to:

- Pacita Complex National High School, school in San Pedro, Laguna, Philippines
- Pines City National High School, school in Baguio, Philippines
