= Pines City National High School =

Public high school in Baguio. Philippines

Location
- Kayang Extension, Baguio; Philippines; 16°24′49″N 120°35′23″E

Information
- Type: Public
- Colors: Maroon, Green, and Yellow or Gold
- Website: pinesnhsbaguio.wixsite.com/pcnhs

Pines City National High School is a public secondary school in Baguio, Philippines. It has a main campus (located on Palma Street), and several annexes and campuses in the city.

== History ==
The Pines City National High School started as an annex of Baguio City National High School with only two classes in the first year with three teachers. The school started with inadequate facilities. As the years passed, problems became greater due to the increase in enrolment. Teachers also increased but not in direct proportion to the increase in the enrolment.

On November 19, 1973, the school became an independent school. In 1976, the Bagong Lipunan school building was constructed. In 1978, another Bagong Lipunan building was constructed, consisting of a classroom. This has minimally eased up the problems of lack of classrooms but school population continued to increase that the fifteen classrooms were not enough to accommodate 1500 students even if an annex was created through the resolution of the city council sponsored by Counselor Jane Bugnosen in 1983. Bonifacio and Quirino are the first two annexes under Pines City National High School.

In July 1987, Pines City National High School was nationalized by virtue of Executive Order 189 placing all secondary school teachers under the administrative supervision and control of the Department of Education, Culture and Sports.

In 1989, PCNHS was nationalized thus the name is changed to Pines City National High School. The first principal was Leandro Flora, followed by Concepcion Valencia and then Philip Flores, Elma Donaal, then the first assistant principal Rosalita Guadana, followed by Flocerfida L. Mina, then Rachel M. Bugtong as principal for decades and then to be Leticia I. Sab-it.

In 1990, PCNHS started a special class and were given incentive allowance by the city government of Baguio. In 1992, PCNHS was chosen as a pilot school for the proposed special science curriculum and one of the Special Science Schools in the entire Philippines.

Another special class been started in 2009, the special class in Journalism. The Special Program in Journalism at the Secondary Level was implemented nationwide in June 2009. This is in line with the Campus Journalism (CJ) Act of 1991 Republic Act no. 7079 which provides for the development and promotion of Campus Journalism and other related purposes.

Now, there are eight buildings, including a newly constructed three-storey, to accommodate the growing enrollment of Pines City National High School.

== Administration ==
PCNHS (Main) is headed by principal Danilo P. Gayao, PhD

== Educational programs ==
PCNHS Main Campus also implements certain programs for students who have high aptitudes in certain areas:

- Special Program in Journalism (SPJ)-Section A
- Special Program in the Arts (SPA)-Section B
- Smart Learning Class (SLC) Section C
- Proficient Class Section D
- Regular Class-Sections E-K
