= 1975 in the Philippines =

- Decades: 1950s; 1960s; 1970s; 1980s; 1990s
- See also: List of years in the Philippines; films

1975 in the Philippines details events of note that happened in the Philippines in the year 1975.

== Incumbents ==
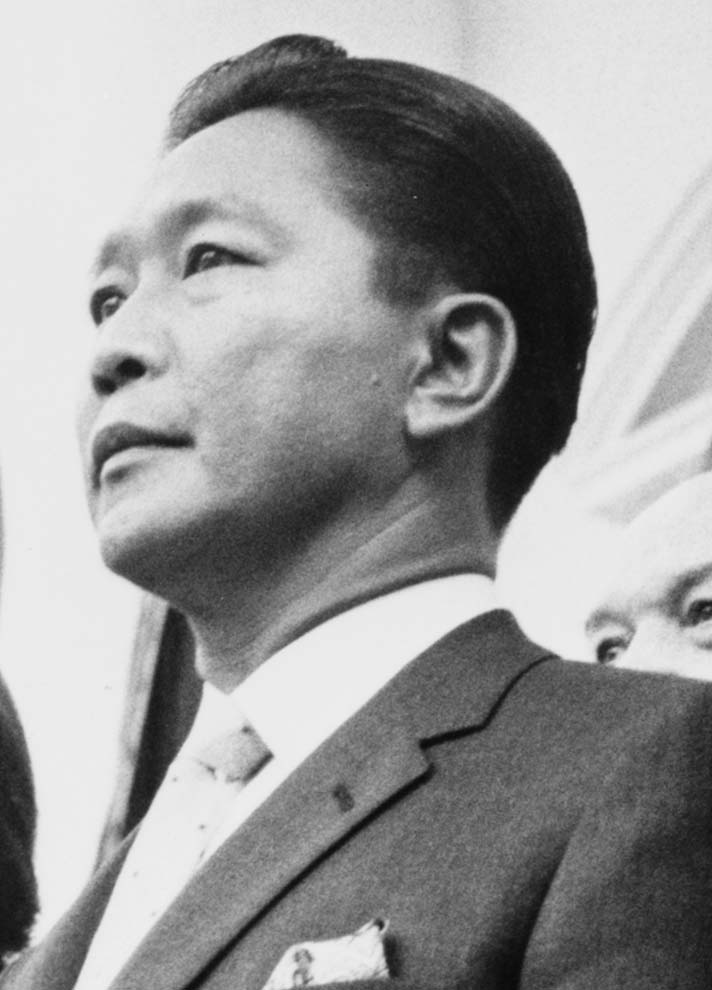
President Ferdinand Marcos at the White House in 1966.

- President: Ferdinand Marcos (Independent)
- Chief Justice: Roberto Concepcion

== Events ==
=== January ===
- January 10 – Fifty-six Christian logging camp workers are reportedly found beheaded in the Zamboanga peninsula area; the massacre is one of the largest single death tolls in the then 28-month Moslem rebellion.
- January 14 – At least 40 troops are killed by Moslem guerrillas in an attack on Maimbung, Sulu, in another largest single death toll in the said rebellion.
- January 22 – In the country's worst fire on record by then, 51 persons are either burned, suffocated, or leaped to their death when a fire sweeps through a factory in a commercial building in Marikina, Rizal. At least 79 others are seriously injured.
- January 25-26 – At least 30 persons were killed during a tropical storm, including 11 who were buried by a landslide and 7 fishermen who died at sea.

=== February ===
- February 1 – The Intercontinental Broadcasting Corporation is launched.
- February 3 – Thirty-one persons were killed when fire in an airliner engine forced the pilot to crash-land in Manila.
- February 27–28 – A national referendum was called where the majority of the barangays voted approved the following: a) The use by the President of his power to restructure the local governments in Greater Manila into an integrated system; b) the appointment by the President of the successors of local elective officials (outside the Greater Manila) whose terms of office expired on December 31, 1975; c) the manner the President has been exercising his powers under Martial Law and the Constitution and that the President should continue exercising the same powers; and d) allowing Martial law to continue, not to convene the Interim National Assembly and extend the terms of local officials by appointment, and suspend elections, pursuant to Presidential Decrees Nos. 1366, 1366-A and 1366-B.

=== April ===
- April 15 – The Kabataang Barangay (KB) was created by virtue of Presidential Decree No. 684. The decree provided for the organization of KB units in the 42,000 barangays all over the country with the purpose of giving the youth a definite role in community affairs.

=== May ===
- May 1 – The Kabataang Barangay elections were held in which about 3 million Filipino youths aged 15 to 18 years old participated.

=== November ===
- November 7 – President Ferdinand Marcos issues Presidential Decree 824 creating the Metropolitan Manila Commission (MMC). It integrates the city of Manila and adjacent Quezon City with the cities of Pasay and Caloocan and municipalities of Makati, Mandaluyong, San Juan, Las Piñas, Malabon, Navotas, Pasig, Pateros, Parañaque, Marikina, Muntinlupa, and Taguig from the province of Rizal and the municipality of Valenzuela from the province of Bulacan to form Metropolitan Manila.

== Holidays ==
As per Act No. 2711 section 29, issued on March 10, 1917, any legal holiday of fixed date falls on Sunday, the next succeeding day shall be observed as legal holiday. Sundays are also considered legal religious holidays. Bonifacio Day was added through Philippine Legislature Act No. 2946. It was signed by then-Governor General Francis Burton Harrison in 1921. On October 28, 1931, the Act No. 3827 was approved declaring the last Sunday of August as National Heroes Day. As per Republic Act No. 3022, April 9 was proclaimed as Bataan Day. Independence Day was changed from July 4 (Philippine Republic Day) to June 12 (Philippine Independence Day) on August 4, 1964.

September 11, President Marcos' birthday, became a holiday beginning this year, after Marcos issued Proclamation No. 1495 declaring the day as a "Special Barangay Day." That, alongside Thanksgiving Day on September 21, were included in the list of special holidays being issued throughout the rest of his presidency.

- January 1 – New Year's Day
- February 22 – Legal Holiday
- March 27 – Maundy Thursday
- March 28 – Good Friday
- April 9 – Araw ng Kagitingan (Day of Valor)
- May 1 – Labor Day
- June 12 – Independence Day
- July 4 – Philippine Republic Day
- August 13 – Legal Holiday
- August 31 – National Heroes Day
- September 11 – Barangay Day
- September 21 – Thanksgiving Day
- November 30 – Bonifacio Day
- December 25 – Christmas Day
- December 30 – Rizal Day

== Business and economy ==
- October 13 – The family of Tony Tan Caktiong opens a Magnolia Ice Cream House, which later became the first Jollibee branch in 1978.

== Entertainment and culture ==
- February 1 – The Intercontinental Broadcasting Corporation is launched in the Philippines.
- December 1 - GMA Radio-Television Arts launches Kapwa Ko Mahal Ko.

== Sports ==
- April 9 – The Philippine Basketball Association is inaugurated at Araneta Coliseum in Quezon City.
- October 1 – The Thrilla in Manila was the third and final boxing match between Muhammad Ali and Joe Frazier for the heavyweight boxing championship of the world, fought at the Araneta Coliseum in Quezon City.

== Births ==
- January 16 – Anthony Taberna, TV and radio host, anchor
- February 7 – Ian Veneracion, actor
- February 11 – Lourd de Veyra, TV host and vocalist of Radioactive Sago Project
- February 13 – Ali Peek, basketball player
- March 3 – Khadaffy Janjalani, Islamist (d. 2006)
- March 10 – Glydel Mercado, actress
- March 14 – Rico Yan, actor (d. 2002)
- March 24 – Paolo Duterte, politician
- May 19 – Curlee Discaya, businessman
- May 20 – Miriam Quiambao, actress and first runner-up in Miss Universe 1999
- June 26 – Luke Mejares, singer-songwriter
- July 15:
  - K Brosas, singer and comedian
  - Viveika Ravanes, actress
- August 2 – Joel Villanueva, politician
- August 15 – William Antonio, basketball player
- August 17 – Carmina Villarroel, actress
- September 22 – Wowie De Guzman, actor and dancer
- September 24 – Francis Adriano, basketball player
- October 17 – Vina Morales, singer and actress
- November 3 – Egay Billones, basketball player
- November 6 – Tisha Silang, TV host and businesswoman
- November 21 – Betong Sumaya, actor and comedian
- November 30 – Diego Castro III, journalist and actor
- December 9 – Ina Raymundo, actress, model and singer
- December 12 – Abigail Binay, lawyer and politician
- December 16 – Aiko Melendez, actress
- December 26:
  - Chris Calaguio, actor
  - Carla Guevara Laforteza, actress and singer

== Deaths ==
- January 6 – Sotero Baluyut, Filipino engineer and politician (b. 1889)
- January 7 – Macario Peralta Jr., soldier, lawyer, and senator (b. 1913)
- January 14 – Miguel Cuaderno Sr., first Governor of the Bangko Sentral ng Pilipinas (b. 1890)
- April 13 – Teófilo Sison, Filipino legislator and first Secretary of National Defense (b. 1880)
- June 14 – Pablo Antonio, Filipino modernist architect (b. 1901)
