= 1972 in the Philippines =

- Decades: 1950s; 1960s; 1970s; 1980s; 1990s
- See also: List of years in the Philippines; films

1972 in the Philippines details events of note that happened in the Philippines in the year 1972.

== Incumbents ==
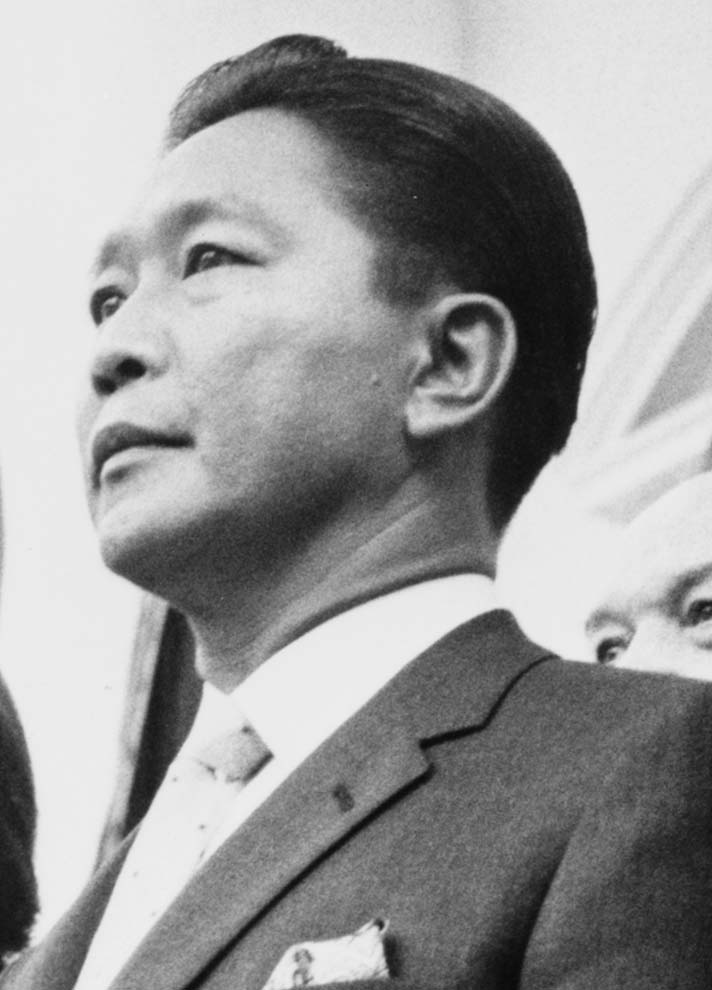
President Ferdinand Marcos at the White House in 1966.

- President: Ferdinand Marcos (Nacionalista Party)
- Vice President: Fernando Lopez (Nacionalista Party) (until September 23)
- House Speaker: Cornelio Villareal
- Chief Justice: Roberto Concepcion
- Congress: 7th (until September 23)

== Events ==
=== January ===
- January 1 – The police drives away an armed gang of 200 men that has raided the town of Banaba in North Cotabato, with 26 civilians and outlaws killed.
- January 12 – President Marcos restores the writ of habeas corpus except for those already detained.
- January 20 – Armed Moslem gunmen ambush a passenger vehicle with eleven persons aboard near Pikit, North Cotabato, killing ten Christian settlers in a case of reprisal killing.
- January 22 – A fire damages the control tower and terminal building of the Manila International Airport in Pasay, kills 7–8 people and injures at least 23 others.

=== February ===
- February 14 – A huge explosion on the site of the World War II ammunition dump within a plastics factory in Pandacan, Manila, causes fire and damages as well adjoining elementary school and many residential buildings around it; kills 16–17 and injuring as high as seventy others.

=== March ===
- Early March – Massive spraying is held in large areas of Palawan island about a week after malaria-bearing African mosquitoes, which has brought by Japanese scientists, escape from a cage in Puerto Princesa, Palawan.
- March 23–April 2 – A 47-member expedition conducted by Presidential Assistant for National Minorities (Panamin) which has been headed by Manuel Elizalde Jr., mostly scientists and later joined by one of the agency's directors—American Charles Lindbergh, makes a first visit to the caves inhabited by 25 "surviving" Tasadays, a group of Stone Age-style people discovered in June 1971, in an isolated mountain rainforest in South Cotabato—the "first discovery of cavemen in modern times." The expedition ends as explorers are rescued by the United States Armed Forces.

=== April ===
- Early April – President Marcos issues an executive order allowing trade with all Communist and Socialist countries which have no diplomatic relations with the country, as well as importation of commercial goods from these countries. In effect, the country will set a deal with China which involves trading on a government-to-government basis, and the national government assigns National Export Trading Corporation as the country's only trading firm to handle trade talks.
- April 7 – President Marcos signs a proclamation reserving a 20,000-hectare land for the Tasadays and Manobo Blit, with Panamin named as administrator.
- April 25 – Explosion of hand grenades tossed into a crowded town square in Cabugao, Ilocos Sur, during a fiesta kills 17 persons and injures nearly a hundred including provincial governor Chavit Singson, in an assassination attempt against him.

=== May ===
- Early May – The House of Representatives launches investigation into the activities of Philippine Statehood, U.S.A., the movement being headed by former congressman Rufino Antonio and has been seeking conversion of the Philippines into the 51st American state. In June, exactly a year after its establishment, the movement claims having the membership of 6.3 million, despite its idea having been dismissed by the national government.
- May 17 – Jaime Jose, Basilio Pineda Jr., and Edgardo Aquino, who—along with Rogelio Canial, died in 1970—have been convicted of the 1967 kidnapping and rape of movie actress Maggie de la Riva, are executed by electric chair in the National Penitentiary, which is witnessed by more than a hundred persons.

=== June ===
- June 24 – The military launches a joint drive against criminals in Mindanao island group. Meanwhile, pirates attack a motorized boat between Balimbing and Simunul in Sulu, and kill five of seven persons aboard.
- June 25 – Typhoon Konsing landfalls on Luzon. It caused 131 deaths and $15 million worth of damage.

=== July ===
- July 4 – Moslems on boats attack a Christian village in Mabuhay, Zamboanga del Sur. Nineteen are reported dead on both sides; six raiders are later captured by the military.
- July 5 – A team of Philippine Constabulary elements discovers MV Karagatan, a freighter has been grounded in the shoreline of Digoyo Point in Palanan, Isabela, which is providing supplies to the New People's Army. The outnumbered team is later involved in a three-day gunfight with the NPA in the mountains, with two Constabulary men injured and preventing the NPA from taking the ship. The operation captures several firearms and ammunition. The incident is one of the reasons of the imposition of Martial Law.
- July 6 – An encounter between followers of Moslem leader Datu Ugol and security forces, who have escorting provincial governor Jose Tecson and municipal mayor Dogracias Carmona, erupts in Dimataling, Zamboanga del Sur. The officials are to meet Datu Ugol in a peace conference when one of the Moslems hacks Carmona to death. Eight Moslems, two policemen and five soldiers are likewise reported killed; Tecson and his escort are later rescued by military helicopters.
- July 7 – The (1971) Constitutional Convention votes for the changing of the form of government from the presidential to the parliamentary system.
- July – August – A series of weather disturbances with heavy rains—the country's heaviest since 1911—hit a wide area covering almost the entire Central Luzon and the present-day Metro Manila, which are being inundated by the floods. President Marcos later proclaims a state of emergency due to several casualties being reported.

=== August ===
- August – The Supreme Court, acting on the petition filed by American businessman William Quasha, declares, in what is called the "Quasha decision", the non-extension after 1974 of American ownership rights granted by the parity amendment, and the illegality of American ownership of private agricultural land between 1946 and 1974.
- August 24 and 28 – Two separate raids by Moslems occur off Siay, Zamboanga del Sur. Six aboard a motorboat are killed in the first attack. Later, an armed band, the Barracudas, raids a motor launch, killing 13; seven others aboard are reported missing.

=== September ===
- September 6 – President Marcos, condemning a deadly hostage-taking in Munich, West Germany, orders the Philippine team, consisting of 54 athletes and 23 officials, to withdraw from the Olympics and "to return home immediately."
- September 11 – Bombing attacks at the main office of the Manila Electric Company (Meralco) and a nearby power substation cause a blackout in several areas in Manila; and are blamed on communist rebels.
- Mid-September – Senator Ninoy Aquino, in his privilege speech at the Senate, exposes Oplan Sagittarius (Note: "Oplan" stands for "Operation plan.") as being revealed to him by sources in the Armed Forces of the Philippines. Under the plan, allegedly for President Marcos to seize power and which has been conceived even before the wave of bombings since March, Greater Manila, the towns of Rizal and the entire Bulacan would be placed under martial law.
- September 16 – The old Colgante Bridge in Naga, across the Bicol River, collapses from the weight of devotees watching a fluvial procession during the regionwide festival of Nuestra Señora de Peñafrancia; 138 persons die.
- September 21 — President Marcos signs Proclamation No. 1081, placing the country under martial law reportedly due to increasing communist activities. While the document bears this date, the public announcement is made two days later. (Note: Proclamation No. 1081 is dated September 21. However, when the document is signed and martial law is declared has been disputed by other sources, saying say it in on September 17, 22, or 23—the day it is announced.) As a result, Marcos would function also as Congress, as it is dissolved and its building is padlocked shut. Constitution and the writ of habeas corpus are suspended.
- September 22 – Defense Secretary Juan Ponce Enrile survives an ambush, allegedly by the communists, on his convoy while on his way home to Makati, Rizal. Although Enrile would admit at a 1986 press conference that the incident had been staged, this claim has been disputed.
- September 23:
  - President Marcos orders the arrest of his political opponents. Senator Aquino, also leader of the opposition Liberal Party (LP) and his main political rival, is the first to be arrested by the military for being a "communist collaborator", at the Hilton Hotel in Manila.
  - The military begins a roundup of individuals, arresting some 8,000 within the first few hours, and taking them to Camp Crame; among them opposition politicians and journalists, student and labor leaders, civil libertarians, members of the elites, constitutional delegates, and leaders of crime syndicates. (Note: Those rounded up includes at least 100 of 400 listed subversives; among them are more than 20 journalists, three opposition senators, seven constitutional delegates, some student activists, and leaders of crime syndicates. Also arrested within the first days, among others, are: Senators Jose Diokno and Ramon Mitra Jr.; Former senators Soc Rodrigo and Sergio Osmeña Jr.; Publishers Chino Roces and Teodoro Locsin Sr.; Journalists Amando Doronila, Max Soliven, Luis Mauricio and Manuel Almario; Broadcast commentator Jose Mari Velez; Businessman Eugenio Lopez Jr.; and; Eleven delegates to the Constitutional Convention.) In December, 15 journalists including publisher Chino Roces, and LP senator Ramon Mitra Jr., are among those granted provisional freedom. Meanwhile, foreign journalists are later deported.
  - All communications and public utilities are seized by the military and placed under their control upon Marcos' orders. Some of several media establishments which immediately closed down, being the government's mouthpieces, are later reopened but under censorship. (Note: For instance, from eight pre-martial law, by December, four English language newspapers would be permitted to resume their publishing.) Meanwhile, seized public utilities include Meralco, Philippine Long Distance Telephone Company, and Iligan Integrated Steel Mill.
  - Marcos imposes a pre-dawn curfew and bans public demonstrations and travel abroad, except on official missions. Curfew and travel ban would be lifted on August 22, 1977.
  - Marcos orders all schools closed for a week.
  - Marcos, through nationwide evening broadcasts, formally announces the official declaration of martial law, citing the attack on Enrile. Press Secretary Francisco Tatad makes the same announcement four hours prior.

=== October ===
- October 2:
  - President Marcos issues a presidential decree setting mandatory death penalty on persons who would use either unlicensed firearms or other deadly weapons in crimes which would cause deaths.
  - Marcos issues a presidential decree setting up incentives for foreign companies that will participate in an expanded exploration for the country's oil resources.
  - The national government announces the largest narcotics raid in country's history, in which the police has seized more than $2 million worth of heroin in a commercial printing press in Caloocan, and has arrested seven persons.
- October 19 – Japanese Army soldier Kinisichi Kozuka is killed in a gunbattle with government troops in Lubang Island where his companion Hiroo Onoda, who is injured, escapes. The two, who have been hiding since the Second World War, have been believed dead since the end of war.
- October 21–23 – A force of nearly a thousand men, calling themselves the Mindanao Revolutionary Council for Independence and being led by the former police chief of Marawi, Lanao del Sur, attacks the city but is forced to withdraw two days later, leaving 75 persons dead. After the attack, the Bangsa Moro Army (BMA) under Nur Misuari begins military operations in Sulu, Cotabato, and Zamboanga.
- October 21 – President Marcos issues Presidential Decree No. 27, outlining his land reform program. The law provides that all tenants working in more than seven hectares of agricultural lands are to be sold the land at a price higher than the average annual production. The eligible tenant would receive a Certificate of Land Transfer that giving them the right to purchase the identified cultivated areas.
- October 29 – Government troops repel in a battle a band of about 500 men, which has attacked a Philippine Constabulary headquarters in Parang, Cotabato. At least 12 of the attackers and one from the government are killed; 22 are injured.

=== November ===
- November – The national government announces that a rightist conspiracy has been uncovered, involving prominent Filipinos and American mercenaries hired to assassinate President Marcos. As of December 9, 85 people have been detained for the alleged plot which has started as early as December 1969, including Serge Osmeña and Manila Chronicle publisher Eugenio Lopez Jr.
- November 8 – The national government announces the suspension of news distribution of Associated Press in the Philippines and censoring all its ongoing news dispatches, in relation to a news article by AP and the Daily Express, which also appeared in the Business Week magazine, on rumors of split in the country's military which has been denied as "false".
- November 29 – The Constitutional Convention without eleven of its delegates, in its 271–14 vote, approves a draft on the new constitution mainly setting up a parliamentary democracy; the ratification on whether the 1935 Constitution will be replaced would be held in January 1973.

=== December ===
- December 7 – First Lady Imelda Marcos, along with three other persons, is injured in a foiled assassination attempt during televised awarding ceremonies on civic beautification campaign in Nayong Pilipino in Pasay. Carlito Dimahilig, a bolo-wielding assassin, is shot dead by security men.
- December 28 – Forty Moslem insurgents are killed in an assault by government troops on their training camp in Zamboanga del Norte.
- December 31 – President Marcos creates Citizens' Assemblies at all barrio levels, as well as districts and wards, through Presidential Decree No. 86; these are subsequently referred to as barangays, thus reviving such ancient-era concept. Made to "broaden the base of citizen participation in the democratic process," these assemblies will be involved in the January 1973 plebiscite.

== Holidays ==
As per Act No. 2711 section 29, issued on March 10, 1917, any legal holiday of fixed date falls on Sunday, the next succeeding day shall be observed as legal holiday. Sundays are also considered legal religious holidays. Bonifacio Day was added through Philippine Legislature Act No. 2946. It was signed by then-Governor General Francis Burton Harrison in 1921. On October 28, 1931, the Act No. 3827 was approved declaring the last Sunday of August as National Heroes Day. As per Republic Act No. 3022, April 9th was proclaimed as Bataan Day. Independence Day was changed from July 4 (Philippine Republic Day) to June 12 (Philippine Independence Day) on August 4, 1964.

- January 1 – New Year's Day
- February 22 – Legal Holiday
- March 30 – Maundy Thursday
- March 31 – Good Friday
- April 9 – Bataan Day
- May 1 – Labor Day
- June 12 – Independence Day
- July 4 – Philippine Republic Day
- August 13 – Legal Holiday
- August 27 – National Heroes Day
- November 30 – Bonifacio Day
- December 25 – Christmas Day
- December 30 – Rizal Day

== Sports ==
- March 20–28 – Marikina hosts the 1972 ISF Men's World Championship in which ten nations participated.
- August 26–September 10 – The country participates in the 1972 Summer Olympics in Munich, West Germany.

== Births ==
- January 30 – Zoren Legaspi, actor and film director
- March 21:
  - Mikee Romero, businessman and politician
  - Lotlot de Leon, actress
- April 27 – Manilyn Reynes, actress and singer
- April 28 – Romnick Sarmenta, actor
- May 3 – Wally Bayola, comedian and actor
- May 8 – Candy Pangilinan, actress and comedian
- May 24 – Rosanna Roces, actress and comedian
- July 15 – Sonny Angara, politician
- July 26 – Ramil Hernandez, politician
- August 23 – Bal David, basketball player
- September 11 – Mujiv Hataman, politician
- September 12 – Jeffrey Cariaso, basketball player and coach
- October 6 – Alex Calleja, comedian and screenwriter
- October 7 – Marlou Aquino, basketball player
- October 10 – Jun Lana, playwright and screenwriter
- November 3 – Annette Gozon-Valdes, businesswoman, film producer, and lawyer
- November 10 – Carlos Celdran, cultural activist and performance artist (d. 2019)
- November 21 – John Rey Tiangco, politician
- December 11 – Janette Garin, physician and politician

== Deaths ==
- April 26 – Fernando Amorsolo, portraitist and painter of rural Philippine landscapes (1972 National Artist of the Philippines) (b. 1892)
- December 6 – José Zulueta, lawyer and politician (b. 1889)
