= 1974 in the Philippines =

- Decades: 1950s; 1960s; 1970s; 1980s; 1990s
- See also: List of years in the Philippines; films

1974 in the Philippines details events of note that happened in the Philippines in the year 1974.

== Incumbents ==
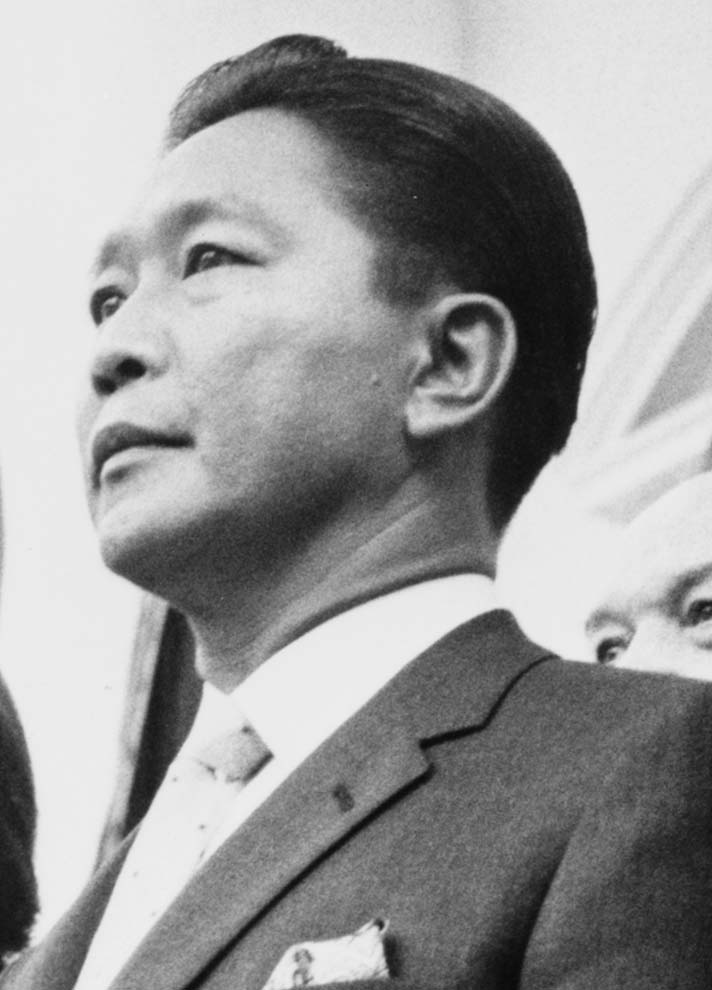
President Ferdinand Marcos at the White House in 1966.

- President: Ferdinand Marcos (Independent)
- Chief Justice: Roberto Concepcion

== Events ==
=== February ===
- Early February – A battle between government troops and Moslem rebels in Jolo, Sulu, causes some parts of the municipality to be destroyed by fire, as well as the evacuation of more than 20,000 people to Zamboanga City.

=== March ===
- March 11 – Japanese lieutenant Hiroo Onoda, one of the longest-remaining Japanese holdouts, formally surrendering his sword to President Marcos at Malacañang Palace after continuing to fight for 29 years in the Lubang Island.

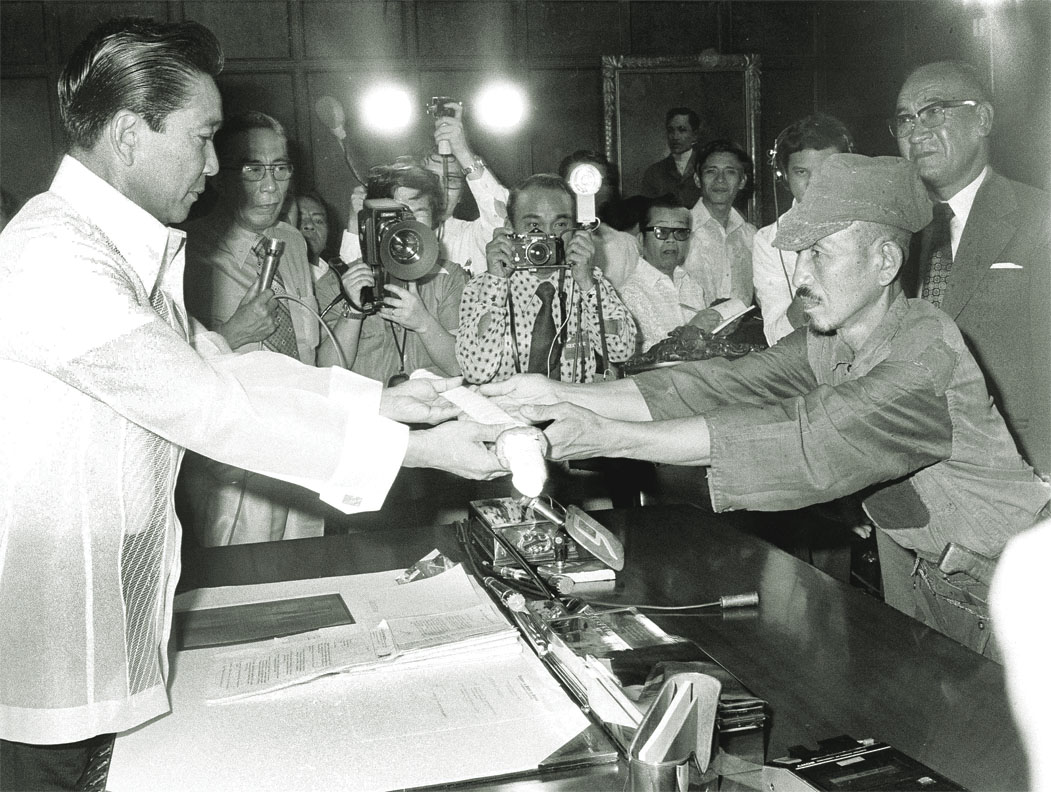
Japanese imperial army soldier Hiroo Onoda (R) offering his military sword to Philippine President Ferdinand E. Marcos (L) on the day of his surrender, March 11, 1974.

=== June ===
- June 20–21 – Moslem rebels attack some areas in central Mindanao, beginning with attacks on an airport in Cotabato and the Maria Cristina Falls hydroelectric plant, and simultaneous raids in Midsayap and Pikit in Cotabato. Sixty-six persons are killed, including 31 Christians who are found during a 10-day trek by refugee families in Cotabato.
  - June 21 – Fighting occurs near a Cotabato airport; with an ambush on an army patrol in Tunuel that kills 17 soldiers.
  - June 21 – A guerrilla attack in Makilala, Cotabato, leaves 12 villagers dead.

=== September ===
- September 21 – Presidential decree No. 557 declares all barrios in the country as barangays.

== Holidays ==
As per Act No. 2711 section 29, issued on March 10, 1917, any legal holiday of fixed date falls on Sunday, the next succeeding day shall be observed as legal holiday. Sundays are also considered legal religious holidays. Bonifacio Day was added through Philippine Legislature Act No. 2946. It was signed by then-Governor General Francis Burton Harrison in 1921. On October 28, 1931, the Act No. 3827 was approved declaring the last Sunday of August as National Heroes Day. As per Republic Act No. 3022, April 9 was proclaimed as Bataan Day. Independence Day was changed from July 4 (Philippine Republic Day) to June 12 (Philippine Independence Day) on August 4, 1964.

- January 1 – New Year's Day
- February 22 – Legal Holiday
- April 9 – Araw ng Kagitingan (Day of Valor)
- April 11 – Maundy Thursday
- April 12 – Good Friday
- May 1 – Labor Day
- June 12 – Independence Day
- July 4 – Philippine Republic Day
- August 13 – Legal Holiday
- August 25 – National Heroes Day
- September 21 – Thanksgiving Day
- November 30 – Bonifacio Day
- December 25 – Christmas Day
- December 30 – Rizal Day

== Entertainment and culture ==
- July 19 – Miss Universe 1974, the 23rd Miss Universe pageant, is held in Manila. Outgoing Miss Universe Margarita Moran, of the Philippines crowned the tearful pageant winner, Amparo Muñoz of Spain. It is the first time that pageant history is held in the Philippines and Southeast Asia.

== Sports ==
- September 1–16 – The country participates in the 1974 Asian Games which is held in Tehran, Iran. It ranked 15th with no gold medals, 2 silver medals and 11 bronze medals with a total of 13 over-all medals.
- September 21–29 – The 1974 Men's World Weightlifting Championships were held in Manila.

== Births ==
- January 10 – Mansueto Velasco, olympic boxer
- January 17 – Lilet, singer, TV host, actress, and commercial model
- January 20 – Racquel Reyes
- January 30 – Alvin Elchico, journalist, news anchor and TV host
- January 31 – Kenneth Duremdes, basketball player
- February 6 – Aljo Bendijo, Journalist, news anchor
- February 7 – Cheryl Cosim, Journalist, news anchor and TV host
- February 18 – Rachel Alejandro, singer actress
- February 26 – Mikee Cojuangco-Jaworski, actress, equestrian and member of the International Olympic Committee
- March 17 – Paolo Bediones, Journalist and TV host
- March 24 – Tado Jimenez, comedian (d. 2014)
- April 5 – Sheryl Cruz, actress and singer
- April 6 – Sherwin Gatchalian, senator and businessman
- May 1 – Charlene Gonzales, beauty queen and TV host
- May 14 – Jennifer Sevilla, actress
- May 19 – Marjorie Barretto, actress
- June 14 – Bong Go, politician
- June 24 – Ruffa Gutierrez, actress and TV personality
- August 4 – Dominic Ochoa, actor
- August 7 – Chuckie Dreyfus, actor
- August 18 - Vince Dizon, economist, consultant, and political aide
- August 21 – Martin Andanar, former secretary of the Presidential Communications Group
- August 24 – Eric Menk, basketball player
- October 24:
  - Isko Moreno, actor, and politician
  - Pia Guanio, TV host
- October 28 – Dayanara Torres, actress, singer, model and writer
- November 1 – Sharmaine Arnaiz, actress
- November 15 – Jiggy Manicad, TV anchor and reporter
- November 21 – Karla Estrada, actress, singer and TV host
- November 28 – apl.de.ap, musician
- December 5 – Donita Rose, TV actress and personality
- December 11 – Lucy Torres, TV actress and personality
- December 15 – Pooh, comedian
- December 20 – Mahal, actress (d. 2021)
