= 1976 in the Philippines =

- Decades: 1950s; 1960s; 1970s; 1980s; 1990s
- See also: List of years in the Philippines; films

1976 in the Philippines details events of note that happened in the Philippines in the year 1976.

== Incumbents ==
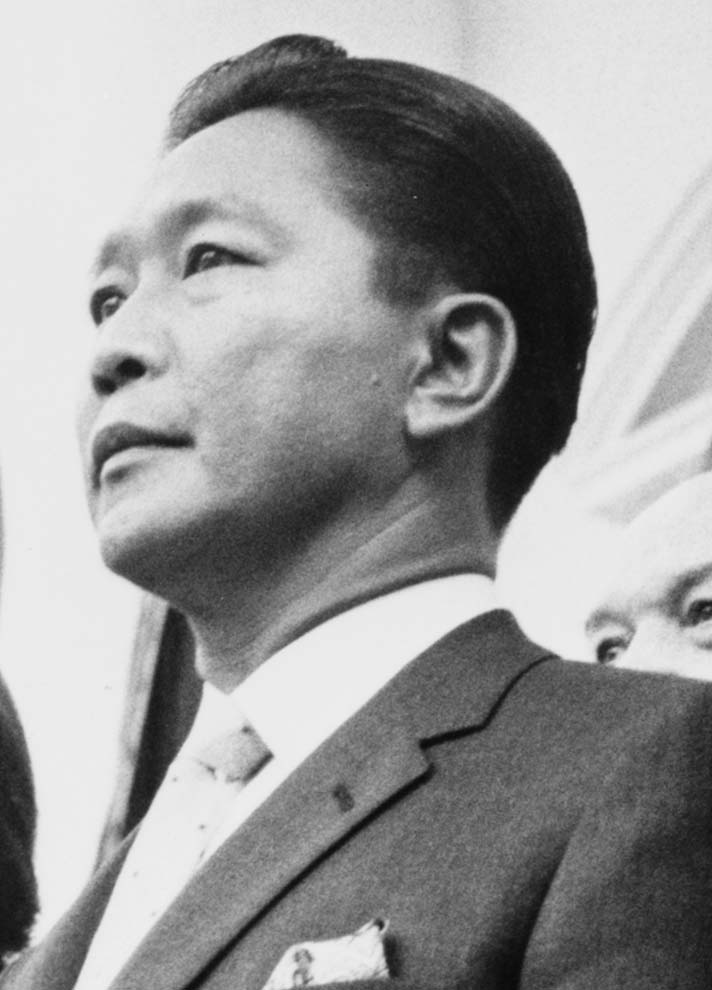
President Ferdinand Marcos at the White House in 1966.

- President: Ferdinand Marcos (Independent)
- Chief Justice: Roberto Concepcion

== Events ==
=== April ===
- April 30 – At least 28 persons are killed in a bus crash near Manila.

=== May ===
- May 20–24 – Flooding in the wake of a typhoon kills 215 persons and left 60,000 homeless in Luzon Island.
- May 21–23 – Six terrorists hijack a Philippine Airlines plane, which lands later on the Zamboanga Airport; hostage crisis ends on May 23 as they explode a plane and a shootout followed, killing 3 of them as well as 10 passengers.

=== August ===
- August 17 – The Moro Gulf earthquake take place near the islands of Mindanao and Sulu, in the Philippines. The magnitude was calculated as being as high as 8.0 on the moment magnitude scale. According to reports, the earthquake was recorded around 16:10 UTC. At least 5,000 people died during the earthquake followed by tsunami.
- August 26 - Bernabe Buscayno also known as Kumander Dante of the New People's Army is arrested.
- August 29 – A boat capsized in Davao River, leaving 19 persons missing and presumed dead.

=== October ===
- October 16–17 – National referendum-plebiscite was called in which the majority of the barangay voters approved that Martial Law should be continued and ratified the proposed amendments to the Constitution substituting the Interim Batasang Pambansa for the Regular Batasang Pambansa, pursuant to Presidential Decrees Nos. 991, 1031, and 1032.

=== December ===
- December 23 – The Tripoli Agreement is signed.

== Holidays ==
As per Act No. 2711 section 29, issued on March 10, 1917, any legal holiday of fixed date falls on Sunday, the next succeeding day shall be observed as legal holiday. Sundays are also considered legal religious holidays. Bonifacio Day was added through Philippine Legislature Act No. 2946. It was signed by then-Governor General Francis Burton Harrison in 1921. On October 28, 1931, the Act No. 3827 was approved declaring the last Sunday of August as National Heroes Day. As per Republic Act No. 3022, April 9th was proclaimed as Bataan Day. Independence Day was changed from July 4 (Philippine Republic Day) to June 12 (Philippine Independence Day) on August 4, 1964.

- January 1 – New Year's Day
- February 22 – Legal Holiday
- April 9 – Araw ng Kagitingan (Day of Valor)
- April 15 – Maundy Thursday
- April 16 – Good Friday
- May 1 – Labor Day
- June 12 – Independence Day
- July 4 – Philippine Republic Day
- August 13 – Legal Holiday
- August 29 – National Heroes Day
- September 11 – Barangay Day
- September 21 – Thanksgiving Day
- November 30 – Bonifacio Day
- December 25 – Christmas Day
- December 30 – Rizal Day

== Sports ==
- July 17–August 1 – The Philippines competed at the 1976 Summer Olympics in Montreal, Canada. The country sends only eleven athletes to Montreal, its smallest delegation since 1932, to compete in track and field, boxing, shooting, swimming and weightlifting.

== Births ==
- January 29 – Arnulf Bryan Fuentebella, politician
- February 2 – Ana Roces, singer and actress
- February 7 – Chito Miranda, singer-songwriter and frontman of Parokya ni Edgar
- February 18 – Bernadette Sembrano, broadcast journalist
- February 19 – Victor Neri, actor and chef
- February 26 – Alex Crisano, basketball player
- March 3 – Isabel Granada, actress and singer (d. 2017)
- March 5 – Maricel Morales, actress, singer and beauty queen
- March 19 - Ana Abad Santos, actress
- March 21 – Bamboo Mañalac, singer and musician
- March 31 – Vice Ganda, comedian, host, and singer
- April 2 – Geneva Cruz, singer and actress
- April 4 – Bearwin Meily, actor, comedian, and magician
- April 21 – Rommel Adducul, basketball player
- May 2 – Alicia Mayer, model and actress
- May 24 – Joseph De Leon, actor and Streetboys member
- May 30 – Ebe Dancel, singer-songwriter and music arranger
- June 4 – Buwi Meneses, Musician
- July 22 – Nino Alejandro, actor, musician and Voice Unlimited member
- July 28 – Nikka Valencia, actress
- August 11 – Jhong Hilario, actor and politician
- August 15 – Paolo Marcoleta, politician
- August 28 – Acel Bisa, singer-songwriter and musician
- September 3 – Karlo Nograles, lawyer and politician
- September 6 – Mylene Dizon, actress
- October 3 – Alfredo Garbin, politician
- October 10 – Mary Rose "Tenten" Munoz, singer and actress
- October 14 – Jayjay Helterbrand, basketball player
- November 10:
  - Sarah Discaya, businesswoman and politician
  - Chedi Vergara, singer, member of Smokey Mountain
- November 27 – Humerlito Dolor, politician
- November 28 – Wynne Arboleda, basketball player
- November 30 – Bobby Andrews, actor
- December 2 – Boom Labrusca, actor
- December 3 – Bernard Palanca, actor
- December 7 – Derek Ramsay, actor and model
- December 8 - Brian Furlow, dancer, actor
- December 8 – Danny Ildefonso, basketball player
- December 10 – Clem Castro, musician
- December 17 - Jao Mapa, actor
- December 17 – Ethel Booba, comedian and singer
- December 24 – Donbel Belano, basketball player

== Deaths ==
- May 20 – Camilo Osías, politician (b. 1889)
- June 12 – Guillermo Tolentino, sculptor and National Artist of the Philippines (b. 1890)
- October 27 – José Yulo, Chief Justice of the Supreme Court of the Philippines (b. 1894)
