= 1977 in the Philippines =

- Decades: 1950s; 1960s; 1970s; 1980s; 1990s
- See also: List of years in the Philippines; films

1977 in the Philippines details events of note that happened in the Philippines in the year 1977.

== Incumbents ==
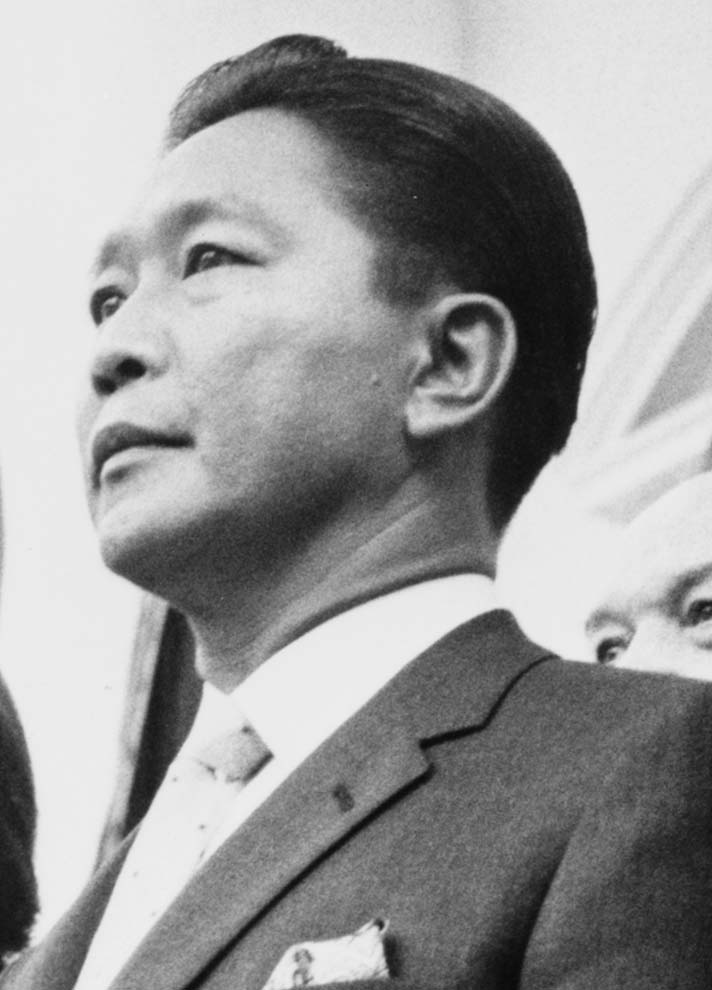
President Ferdinand Marcos at the White House in 1966.

- President: Ferdinand Marcos (Independent)
- Chief Justice: Roberto Concepcion

== Events ==
=== June ===
- June 28 – At least 17 persons were killed in a landslide caused by heavy rains in southern Philippines.

=== August ===
- August 21-27 – World Law Conference was held in Manila. On August 22, during the event, President Marcos announces amnesty for some persons "deemed guilty of subversion."

=== September ===
- September 5 – Sixteen persons were killed and 24 others were injured when two speeding trucks crashed into a bus .
- September 17 – Teatro Tomasino is formed by 25 students and it became the official theater guild of the University of Santo Tomas.

=== October ===
- October 1 – Eugenio Lopez, Jr. and Sergio Osmeña III escaped from detention in Fort Bonifacio and flee to the United States.
- October 10 – A massacre in Patikul, Sulu leaves 35 Philippine Army officers and men dead.
- October 21 – A U.S. Marine Corps helicopter crashed during a military exercise in Mindoro, killing 24 servicemen.

=== November ===
- November 10 – Communist Party of the Philippines (CPP) Chairman Jose Maria Sison was arrested.
- November 15 – A typhoon kills about 80 persons in northern Philippines. Among the dead are at least 40 killed after a fire at the tourist hotel in Manila a day earlier, caused by a candle being lit during a power failure.
- November 25 – Benigno Aquino Jr. was found guilty of charges and sentence him to death by firing squad, but the death sentence was postponed.

=== December ===
- December 16–17 – National referendum was called where the majority of the voters voted that President Ferdinand Marcos should continue in office as incumbent President and Prime Minister after the organization of the Interim Batasang Pambansa.
- December 16 – Thirty-two patients were killed by a fire in a mental hospital near Manila.

== Holidays ==
As per Act No. 2711 section 29, issued on March 10, 1917, any legal holiday of fixed date falls on Sunday, the next succeeding day shall be observed as legal holiday. Sundays are also considered legal religious holidays. Bonifacio Day was added through Philippine Legislature Act No. 2946. It was signed by then-Governor General Francis Burton Harrison in 1921. On October 28, 1931, the Act No. 3827 was approved declaring the last Sunday of August as National Heroes Day. As per Republic Act No. 3022, April 9 was proclaimed as Bataan Day. Independence Day was changed from July 4 (Philippine Republic Day) to June 12 (Philippine Independence Day) on August 4, 1964.

- January 1 – New Year's Day
- February 22 – Legal Holiday
- April 8 – Maundy Thursday
- April 9:
  - Good Friday
  - Bataan Day
- May 1 – Labor Day
- June 12 – Independence Day
- July 4 – Philippine Republic Day
- August 13 – Legal Holiday
- August 28 – National Heroes Day
- September 11 – Barangay Day
- September 21 – Thanksgiving Day
- November 30 – Bonifacio Day
- December 25 – Christmas Day
- December 30 – Rizal Day

== Births ==
- January 3 – Angel Jacob, actress, TV host, and commercial model
- January 4 – Vhong Navarro, actor, comedian, and host
- January 9:
  - Jose Riano, politician
  - Maria Jocelyn Bernos, politician
- January 12 – Piolo Pascual, actor
- January 16 – Antonio Aquitania, actor and comedian
- February 8 – Christian Vasquez, actor and model
- February 14 – Donna Cruz, actress and singer
- February 22:
  - Gladys Guevarra, singer and comedian
  - Bernadette Allyson, actress
  - Yul Servo, actor and politician
- February 25 – Niña Corpuz, journalist
- March 10 – TJ Manotoc, television journalist, news, host and sportscaster
- March 19 – Gherome Ejercito, basketball player
- March 31 – Eric Fructuoso, actor
- April 18 – Anna Fegi, singer
- May 4 – Blue De Leon, actor and commercial model
- May 7 – Bam Aquino, politician
- May 9 – Joymee Lim, actress
- May 12 – Onemig Bondoc, actor
- June 1 – Dondon Hontiveros, basketball player and politician
- June 10 – Guila Alvarez, actress and dancer
- June 23 – Gladys Reyes, actress
- July 10 – Don Allado, basketball player
- July 12 – Jejomar Binay Jr., politician
- July 13:
  - Jake Roxas, actor
  - Willie Miller, basketball player
- July 14 – Jed Madela, singer and TV host
- July 18 – Sunshine Cruz, actress
- July 22 – Celino Cruz, basketball player
- July 30:
  - Troy Montero, actor and model
  - Bryan Gahol, basketball player (d. 2014)
- August 3 - Jeffrey Hidalgo, actor and musician
- August 11 - Mark Zambrano, News anchor and journalist
- August 26 – Barbie Almalbis, singer, songwriter
- September 1 – Kathleen de Leon Jones, Filipino-Australian actress, dancer, singer and television performer, Hi-5
- September 5 — Patricia Bermudez-Hizon sportscaster
- September 12 – Luis Santiago, TV director (d. 2005)
- September 26 – Mark Salazar, host, newscaster and reporter
- October 10 – Brandon Vera, actor, retired mixed martial artist and former MMA World Champion
- October 18 – Gloc-9, rapper and recording artist
- October 19 – Mo Twister, radio and television presenter
- November 4 – Dakila Cua, politician
- November 6 – Sol Aragones, journalist and politician
- November 9 – Lord Allan Velasco, politician
- November 26 – Amado Espino III, politician
- November 27 – Andrea del Rosario, actress and model
- December 5 – Francis Zamora, politician, businessman, and basketball player
- December 11 – Bassilyo, actor and rapper
- December 29 – Erico Aristotle Aumentado, businessman and politician
- December 30 – Jimmy Alapag, basketball player and coach

== Deaths ==
- April 30 – Eddie Peregrina, Filipino singer (b. 1945)
- May 1 – José Locsin, Filipino doctor and politician (b. 1891)
- September 8 – George J. Willmann, Naturalized Filipino missionary from the United States. (b. 1897)
- November 11 – Abraham Sarmiento, Jr., Filipino journalist and political activist (b. 1950)

=== Unknown ===
- August – Eulogio Balao, Filipino soldier and politician (b. 1907)
