= 1978 in the Philippines =

- Decades: 1950s; 1960s; 1970s; 1980s; 1990s
- See also: List of years in the Philippines; films

1978 in the Philippines details events of note that happened in the Philippines in the year 1978.

== Incumbents ==
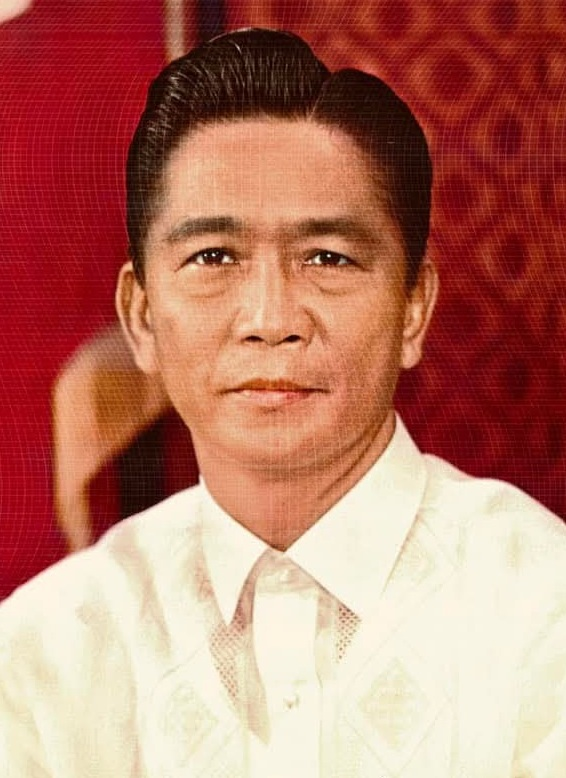
Ferdinand E.
Marcos Sr.

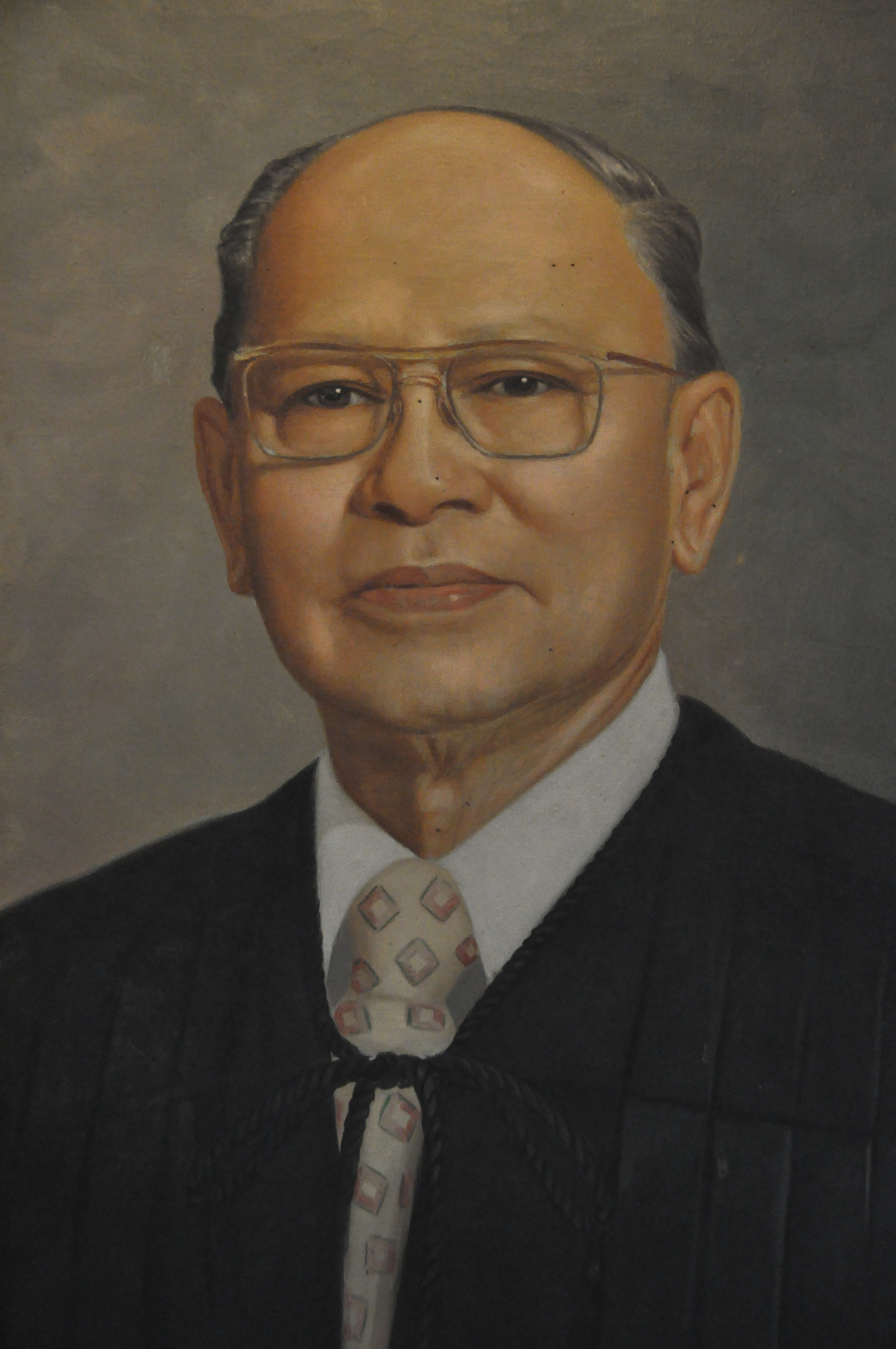
Querube C.
Makalintal

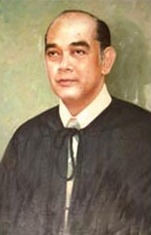
Fred Ruiz
Castro

- President: Ferdinand Marcos (KBL)
- Prime Minister: Ferdinand Marcos (KBL) (post established on June 12)
- House Speaker:
  - Vacant (until June 12)
  - Querube Makalintal (starting June 12)
- Chief Justice: Fred Ruiz Castro

== Events ==
=== January ===
- January 3 – Eleven worshipers die when fire broke out in a Buddhist temple in Manila.

=== April ===
- April 7 – General elections are held for the election of the 166 (out of 208) regional representatives to the Interim Batasang Pambansa (the nation's first parliament). The elections are contested by the leading opposition party, the Lakas ng Bayan (LABAN) which had twenty-one candidates for the Metro Manila area and the leading candidate is the jailed opposition leader Ninoy Aquino while the regime's party known as the Kilusang Bagong Lipunan (KBL) which is led by the then First Lady Imelda Marcos.
- April 27 – Parliamentary sectoral elections for the election of the Interim Batasang Pambansa sectoral representatives is held.

=== July ===
- July 9 – At least 11 persons are killed and 110 injured when fire broke out in a theater complex in Manila.

=== August ===
- August 25 – Tropical Storms severely battered the northern Philippines and Manila, killing more than 50 persons.

=== September ===
- September 14 – A Philippine Air Force plane, carrying members of President Ferdinand E. Marcos' security staff and journalists, crash in Manila while trying to land in a thunderstorm. At least 32 persons are killed.

=== October ===
- October 27 – Typhoon Rita pummels Manila with winds up to 94 miles per hour (150 kilometers per hour). At least 20 are killed and 70,000 left homeless in the floods that resulted.

=== November ===
- November 21 – Batas Pambansa Bilang 7 establishes Aurora, then a sub-province and an administrative area in Quezon, as an independent province; it would be ratified in a plebiscite in May 1979.

== Holidays ==
As per Act No. 2711 section 29, issued on March 10, 1917, any legal holiday of fixed date falls on Sunday, the next succeeding day shall be observed as legal holiday. Sundays are also considered legal religious holidays. Bonifacio Day was added through Philippine Legislature Act No. 2946. It was signed by then-Governor General Francis Burton Harrison in 1921. On October 28, 1931, the Act No. 3827 was approved declaring the last Sunday of August as National Heroes Day. As per Republic Act No. 3022, April 9 was proclaimed as Bataan Day. Independence Day was changed from July 4 (Philippine Republic Day) to June 12 (Philippine Independence Day) on August 4, 1964.

- January 1 – New Year's Day
- February 22 – Legal Holiday
- March 23 – Maundy Thursday
- March 24 – Good Friday
- April 9 – Bataan Day
- May 1 – Labor Day
- June 12 – Independence Day
- July 4 – Philippine Republic Day
- August 13 – Legal Holiday
- August 27 – National Heroes Day
- September 11 – Barangay Day
- September 21 – Thanksgiving Day
- November 30 – Bonifacio Day
- December 25 – Christmas Day
- December 30 – Rizal Day

== Entertainment and culture ==
=== Premieres ===
- The PBA on GTV (sports program)

== Sports ==
- October 1–14 – The 1978 FIBA World Championship is hosted by Philippines. Rizal Memorial Coliseum at Manila and Araneta Coliseum at Quezon City, Metro Manila were the venues for the event. The Philippines ranked seventh place in the event.
- December 9–20 – The Philippines participated in the 1978 Asian Games held in Bangkok, Thailand. It ranked ninth with 4 gold medals, 4 silver medals and 6 bronze medals with a total of 14 over-all medals.

== Births ==
- January 4 – Lino Cayetano, politician and television director
- January 25 – Nyoy Volante, singer
- January 31 – Jessa Zaragoza, actress and singer
- February 3 – Miko Palanca, actor (d. 2019)
- February 8 – Francis Pasion, film and television director (d. 2016)
- March 1 – Brandon Cablay, basketball player
- March 6 – Archie Alemania, actor, host, and comedian
- March 18 – Juris Fernandez, singer-songwriter
- March 21 – Joyce Jimenez, actress
- March 26 – Gian Sotto, actor and politician
- March 31 – Jacqui Manzano, actress
- April 20 – Jaypee de Guzman, actor
- April 27 – Jane Zaleta, actress
- May 7 – Dette Escudero, politician
- May 11 – Judy Ann Santos, television and film actress
- May 28 – Rufa Mae Quinto, actress and comedian
- May 31 – Sara Duterte, politician
- June 8 – Mr. Fu, radio and television personality
- June 10 – Ricky Calimag, basketball player
- June 14 – Giselle Toengi, actress
- June 17 – KC Montero, host, radio and television presenter
- July 1 – Precious Hipolito, politician
- July 13 – Gary David, basketball player
- July 14 – Karl Kendrick Chua, economist and acting secretary of National Economic and Development Authority
- July 22 – Ryan Eigenmann, actor
- August 12 – Jan Marini, singer, actress, blogger and television personality
- August 14 – Mark Villar, businessman and politician
- August 24 – Tony dela Cruz, basketball player
- September 8 – Regine Tolentino, TV host, actress, and businesswoman
- September 17 – Jennifer Rosales, golfer
- October 22 – Lindsay Custodio, actress and singer.
- November 3 – Ryan Rems, comedian
- November 6 – Jolina Magdangal, actress, singer, and television personality
- November 23 - Emil Sumangil, television journalist
- November 26 – Jamir Garcia, frontman of Slapshock (d. 2020)
- November 27 – Gem Ramos, actress
- December 8 – Pia Arcangel, television journalist
- December 17 – Manny Pacquiao, boxer and politician

== Deaths ==
- February 22 – Usman Mundoc (33), mayor of Luuk, Sulu
- August 24 – Hyacinth Gabriel Connon (67), American-Filipino Lasallian Brother
