= 1973 in the Philippines =

- Decades: 1950s; 1960s; 1970s; 1980s; 1990s
- See also: List of years in the Philippines; films

1973 in the Philippines details events of note that happened in the Philippines in the year 1973.

== Incumbents ==
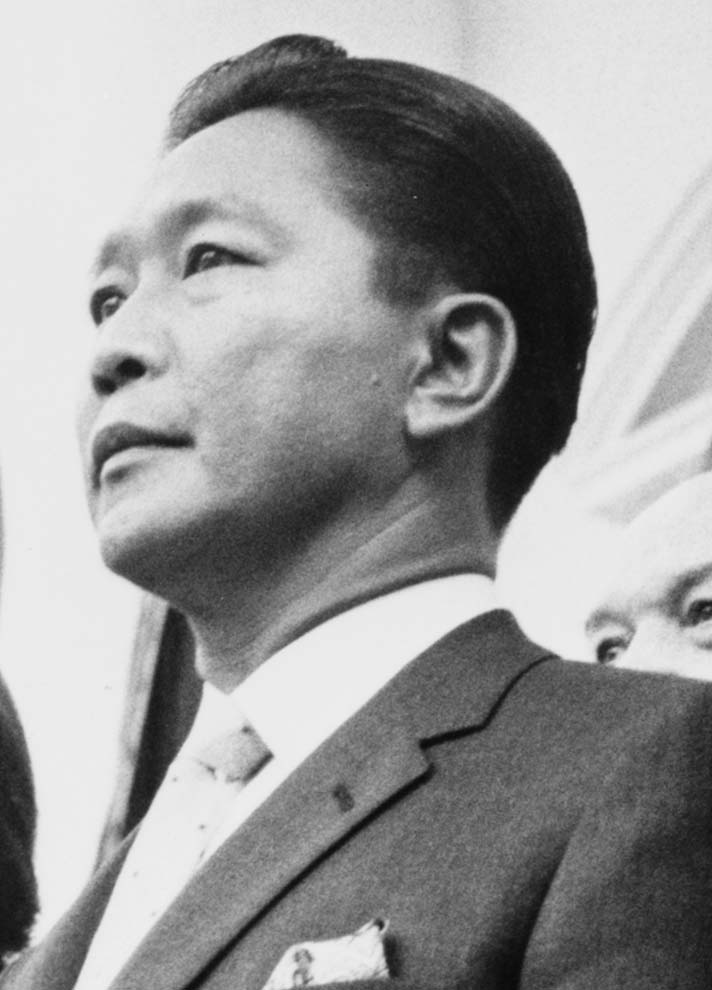
President Ferdinand Marcos at the White House in 1966.

- President: Ferdinand Marcos (Independent)
- Chief Justice:
  - Roberto Concepcion (until April 18)
  - Querube Makalintal (starting April 18)

== Events ==
=== January ===
- January 15:
  - A nationwide referendum on whether the proposed new constitution—mainly setting up a parliamentary democracy—will replace that of 1935 is held. On January 10, citizens' assemblies, organized by the national government, has begun 6-day meetings to carry out such exercise.
  - Chinese Lim Seng (Guan Suo So), upon order from Pres. Marcos on January 3, is publicly executed by firing squad in a firing range in Fort Bonifacio, Rizal for drug trafficking; the country's first execution by that method after 27 years, and only drug convict executed in the martial law era. He was charged in connection to a case wherein illegal drugs were seized in an operation in parts of Metro Manila in 1972.
- January 17 – The 1973 Constitution is declared ratified, which provides the incumbent president the right to continue exercising his powers under the 1935 Constitution and the powers vested in the President and the Prime Minister under the new Constitution.
- January 31 – Supreme Court decides in a case filed against Commission of Elections, that the "incumbent president of the Philippines" is Pres. Marcos, as stated in the Transitory Provisions of the 1973 Constitution.

=== March ===
- March 17 – A magnitude 7.0 earthquake that hit a southern Luzon area kills 14 and injures a hundred. It causes an estimated $2 million in damage; the municipalities of Lopez and Calauag in Quezon are the hardest hit.
- March 18 – President Marcos announces that the insurgency in Mindanao has almost been crushed. This follows a fighting that has started in late February after a failed two-month amnesty program. The fighting in North Cotabato, the largest among others, between government troops and Moslem dissidents has killed about 300.
- April 24 – National Democratic Front is founded as the political arm of the Communist Party of the Philippines.
- May – Masagana 99 program is launched by President Marcos.

=== July ===
- July 27–28 – National referendum is held wherein 90.67% from the Citizen Assemblies voted for the ratification of the 1973 Constitution and the continuation of Martial Law, as well as continuation of Pres. Marcos' term beyond 1973.

=== August ===
- August 27 – Benigno Aquino Jr. refuses to recognize the military court that will try him on various charges.
- August 30 – President Marcos signs Proclamation No. 1180, declaring September 21 as National Thanksgiving Day, in response to a formal resolution by the Association of Barrio Captains. The annual celebration is moved to coincide with the foundation of the so-called "Bagong Lipunan" (New Society), and is first celebrated that year. This ceases after the 1986 EDSA People Power Revolution—the end of Marcos' presidency.

=== September ===
- September 27 – Eight municipalities of Sulu are removed from its jurisdiction to create the new province of Tawi-Tawi (Presidential Decree No. 302), with Bato-Bato, Balimbing as its capital.

=== November ===
- November 22 – Old Cotabato province is divided into three new provinces: North Cotabato (with Kidapawan as its capital), Maguindanao (capital, Maganoy) and Sultan Kudarat (capital, Isulan). (PD No. 302)

=== December ===
- December 27
  - The Philippines ratifies its treaty with Japan, which provides the extension of non-discriminatory treatment to each other in two-way trade. However, the national government explains that it will have to be waived in case the Philippines becomes member of the proposed free trade area by ASEAN.
  - Part of Zamboanga del Sur is removed from its jurisdiction to create the new province of Basilan (PD No. 356), with Isabela as its capital.

== Holidays ==
As per Act No. 2711 section 29, issued on March 10, 1917, any legal holiday of fixed date falls on Sunday, the next succeeding day shall be observed as legal holiday. Sundays are also considered legal religious holidays. Bonifacio Day was added through Philippine Legislature Act No. 2946. It was signed by then-Governor General Francis Burton Harrison in 1921. On October 28, 1931, the Act No. 3827 was approved declaring the last Sunday of August as National Heroes Day. As per Republic Act No. 3022, April 9 was proclaimed as Bataan Day. Independence Day was changed from July 4 (Philippine Republic Day) to June 12 (Philippine Independence Day) last August 4, 1964.

In the case of Thanksgiving Day which had been celebrated every fourth Thursday of November since the United States occupation, following the 1972 declaration of martial law, President Marcos issued Proclamation No. 1181, moving it to September 21 to coincide with the establishment of what was called "Bagong Lipunan", effective that year. The celebration continued until before the 1986 ouster of Marcos.

- January 1 – New Year's Day
- February 22 – Legal Holiday
- April 9 – Araw ng Kagitingan (Day of Valor)
- April 19 – Maundy Thursday
- April 20 – Good Friday
- May 1 – Labor Day
- June 12 – Independence Day
- July 4 – Philippine Republic Day
- August 13 – Legal Holiday
- August 26 – National Heroes Day
- September 21 – Thanksgiving Day
- November 30 – Bonifacio Day
- December 25 – Christmas Day
- December 30 – Rizal Day

== Entertainment and culture ==
- July 21 – Miss Philippines Margarita Moran is the second Filipino to be crowned as Miss Universe 1973 which was held in Athens, Greece.
- November 4 – Banahaw Broadcasting Corporation began radio-television operations.

== Sports ==
- November 18–23 – The inaugural Asian Athletics Championships is held in Marikina, Rizal.
- December 1–15 – The 1973 Asian Basketball Confederation Championship were held in Manila.

== Births ==
- January 8 – Keempee de Leon, actor, comedian, singer, songwriter and TV host
- January 22 – John Apacible, actor (d. 2011)
- January 23 – Epy Quizon, actor
- January 31 – Jay Manalo, actor and model
- February 7 – Angel Aquino, film and television actress
- March 2 – Asi Taulava, Filipino-Tongan basketball player
- March 4 – Jun Ynares, physician and politician
- March 8 – Mickey Ferriols, Filipino actress
- March 17 - Rico Blanco, musician, singer-songwriter, actor, record producer, endorser
- May 5 – Maey Bautista, actress and comedian
- May 12 – Nancy Binay, politician
- May 25 – Gelli de Belen, actress
- June 13 - John Estrada, actor
- June 14 – Pekto, actor and comedian
- July 3 – Mimi Miyagi, Filipino model, pornographic actress, film director and actress
- July 7 – John Lapus, actor, host, and comedian
- July 19 – Diether Ocampo, actor, singer, model, and military officer
- July 20 – Raymart Santiago, TV host, actor, and comedian.
- September 6 – Oliver Agapito, basketball player
- September 12 – Kara David, broadcast journalist
- September 26 – Rovilson Fernandez, television host
- November 23 – Jun Sabayton, actor, comedian, host, and director.
- December 8 – Richard Poon, singer
- December 13 – Adeline Dumapong, Paralympic weightlifter.

== Deaths ==
- January 30 – Quintín Paredes, lawyer and politician (b. 1884)

== See also ==
- 1973 in sports
