= Lemery Works =

Steel Mill in Lemery, Philippines

- Built: 2023 (planned)
- Location: Lemery, Batangas, Philippines
- Industry: Steel
- Products: H beams; I beams; sheet piles; heavy angles; structural channels
- Employees: 1,500 (planned)
- Owner(s): SteelAsia

Lemery Works, also known as Batangas Works, is a steel mill under-construction in Lemery, Batangas, Philippines. Owned by SteelAsia, it is set to become the first steel beam manufacturing plant in the Philippines upon its completion in 2023.

== History ==
Lemery Works was a project of Filipino firm SteelAsia Manufacturing Corp. and Chinese firm HBIS Group Limited. The two companies signed a memorandum of understanding on August 30, 2019, to develop an integrated iron and steel facility in Lemery, Batangas during the Philippine-China Business Forum, a side event of President Rodrigo Duterte's diplomatic visit to China.

Groundbreaking for the steel mill began in 2019 and is expected to be finished in 2023. Upon its completion, Lemery Works will become the first steel beam manufacturing plant in the Philippines, which would reduce the need to import certain steel products such as H/I beams, sheet piles, heavy angles, and channels. Construction works for the steel mill was delayed due to community quarantines measures imposed in the country in response to the COVID-19 pandemic.

== Facilities ==
SMS of Germany and Fives in Steel of France provided the design and equipment for the Lemery Works plant. It has two production lines; for steelmaking and steel section rolling. The plant is expected to be run by 1,500 employees and have a capacity to produce 1.1 million tons of steel products annually.
