= Fight Batman Fight! =

Fight Batman Fight
- Directed by: Romeo N. Galang
- Written by: Romeo N. Galang
- Starring: Victor Wood; Roderick Paulate; Pinky Montilla; Gloria Romero; Rosemarie Gil; Lotis Key; Eva Linda; Rossana Marquez
- Release date: 1973
- Country: Philippines
- Language: Tagalog / Filipino

Fight Batman Fight! is a 1973 Filipino Batman action-fantasy film produced by Pacific Films (Philippines).

It stars Victor Wood as Batman, Rod Navarro as Joker, comedians Roderick Paulate as Robin, German Moreno, Ike Lozada, drama actresses Gloria Romero, Rosemarie Gil, Lotis Key as Cat Woman and Pinky Montilla as Bat Girl.

== Cast ==
A newspaper advertisement for Fight Batman Fight!

- Victor Wood as Batman
- Lotis Key as Catwoman
- Rod Navarro as Joker
- Pinky Montilla as Bat Girl
- Roderick Paulate as Robin
- Gloria Romero
- Rosemarie Gil
- Eva Linda
- Rossana Marquez
- Nick Romano
- Romy Diaz
- Ike Lozada
- German Moreno
- Danny Rojo
- Robert Talabis
