= National Steel Corporation Iligan Plant =

Manufacturer in the Philippines

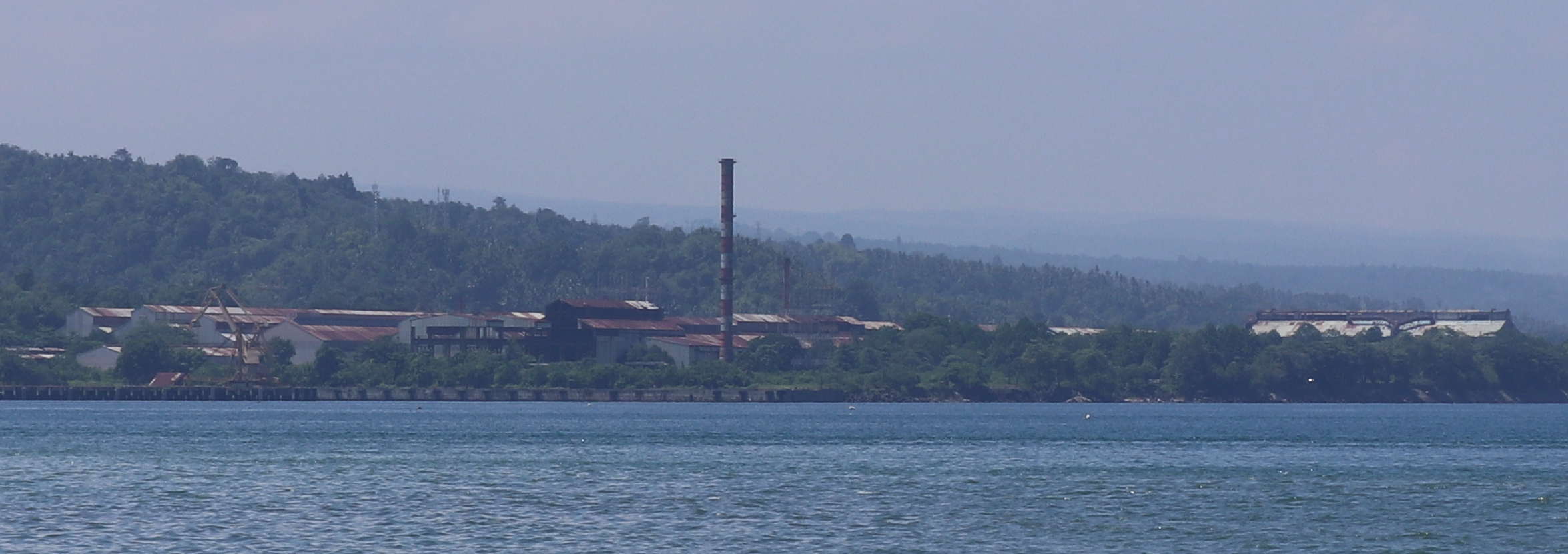
- Built: 1952
- Operated: 1952–2009
- Location: Iligan, Philippines
- Coordinates: 8°12′27.6″N 124°12′38.4″E
- Industry: Steel
- Area: 400 hectares (990 acres)
- Owners: National Shipyards and Steel Corporation (1952–1963); Iligan Integrated Steel Mills, Inc. (1963–1974); National Steel Corporation (1974–2004); Global Steel Philippines Inc. (2004–2016); Iligan City Government (2016–)

The National Steel Corporation Iligan Plant was a steelworks in Iligan, Philippines. At one point during its operation, it was considered as the largest steel mill in Asia.

== History ==
=== Early years ===
The Iligan Steel Mill was established in 1952 as a government-initiated project of the National Shipyards and Steel Corporation (NASSCO).

After NASSCO applied for a $62.3 million loan from the United States-based Eximbank to fund projects, the latter suggested a transfer of the facilities' management to the private entity. The company was sold in 1963 to Iligan Integrated Steel Mills, Inc. of the Jacinto family.

=== Under NSC ===
In 1974, NASSCO assets were absorbed by newly incorporated National Steel Corporation. NSC was later acquired by Wing Tiek of the Malaysian Westmont Group in 1995.

NSC was severely affected by the 1997 Asian financial crisis which caused it to be unable to counter the dumping of cheap imported steel in the Philippine market. In 2000, the government ordered for NSC's liquidation.

=== Under Ispat and closure ===
The Iligan Steel Mill was acquired in 2004 by Ispat Industries Ltd of India. The company faced financial and labor issues, which led to the facility's closure in 2009.

=== Post-closure ===
The city government of Iligan has attempted to auction off the 400-hectare steel mill in 2016 but there were no interested bidders. The properties associated with the steel mill were then forfeited to the Iligan city government.

SteelAsia has offered to acquire NSC's steel mill in Iligan in 2019. The local government of Iligan is also attempting to reopen the defunct steel mill.

In 2025, efforts to revive the plant was restarted again during the administration of President Bongbong Marcos. The Philippine Economic Zone Authority signed an agreement with the Iligan city government in February 2026 with the two parties looking to find investors to restart the plant.
