= Sweet Revenge (1987 film) =

1987 film

- theatrical poster
- Directed by: Mark Sobel
- Screenplay by: Steven M. Krauzer; Tim McCoy; Jim Beaver
- Story by: Michael Jones; Randy Kornfield
- Produced by: Brad Krevoy; Roger Corman; Steven Stabler
- Starring: Nancy Allen; Ted Shackelford; Martin Landau; Sal Landi; Gina Gershon; Michele Little; Stacey Adams; Lotis Key
- Cinematography: Shane D. Kelly
- Edited by: Michael S. Murphy
- Music by: Ernest Troost
- Distributed by: MGM
- Release date: February 1987
- Running time: 90 minutes
- Country: United States
- Language: English

Sweet Revenge is a 1987 American motion picture starring Nancy Allen as Jillian Grey, a newscaster abducted and sold into white slavery while doing an undercover expose. Ted Shackelford, Martin Landau, Gina Gershon, Michele Little, and Lotis Key round out the cast of this R-rated action adventure directed by Mark Sobel with Roger Corman acting as executive producer.

== Plot ==
In Los Angeles, California, television reporter Jillian Grey investigates the disappearance of several women. Jillian goes to meet an informant who tells her a businessman is having the women kidnapped and taken to the Far East where he drugs them and sells them to the highest bidder. This is being done under the guise of a research foundation; once Jillian finds the foundation, she will have her story. After Jillian leaves, a woman named Sonya shoots and kills the informant, then shoots and kills Jillian’s producer, who was parked in a nearby van secretly recording the conversation.

In Hollywood, California, three young women, K. C., Tina, and Lee meet Sonya, who is posing as a modeling agent. Sonya tells them they are perfect for what she needs, but does not have time to go into detail as she has to catch a flight to Thailand. The women volunteer to ride to the airport with her for further discussion. However, once at the airport, Sonya’s man pulls a gun and forces the three young women onto a private plane.

Sonya breaks into Jillian’s house and kills Jillian’s husband. Sonya’s man chloroforms Jillian and kidnaps her. In Asia, Jillian, K. C., Tina, and Lee are being transported in the back of a van when they escape and run through the streets. Sonya catches up and kills Tina. Jillian, K. C., and Lee run the other direction but, are soon blocked by one of Sonya’s men. Just then, a mercenary named Boone comes out of a bar and punches Sonya’s man. However, another of Sonya’s men arrives and knocks Boone out. Sonya and her men take Boone, Jillian, K. C., and Lee to the Cicero Research Foundation in the jungle. The woman are injected with heroin while Boone is tied to a rafter in a back room. Jillian is taken to the office of foundation head Jeffrey Cicero. He shows her a newspaper article about her disappearance. A terrorist group is claiming responsibility, saying it was “designed to demonstrate contempt for the U.S. media.” Jillian, K. C., and Lee are taken to a stage at a club in the Foundation compound where men start bidding to buy them. When one of the men examines Jillian closely, she tells him to go to hell. He slaps her and she grabs a machine gun from one of the guards and starts firing into the audience. The three women escape, free Boone, and all flee in a truck. Chasing them in Jeeps, Cicero’s men fire machine guns at the truck, but Boone and the women elude their pursuers.

Safe in the jungle, the women want to go to the American embassy for help, but Boone warns that Cicero carries too much clout. Jillian refuses to leave Thailand until she finds her eight-year-old daughter, Jaimie, whom she assumes was also kidnapped. K. C. and Lee promise to help her and draft Boone into assisting them. Boone is upset that all his jugs of counterfeit perfume in the back of the truck were destroyed by machine gun fire. He can buy the jugs of perfume for $200 and sell them to someone in America for $1,000. Boone and the women go to see a pirate named Buddha, who has connections throughout the area. Buddha reports Cicero has put up a bounty for their capture. He is happy to help, but first wants Boone to pick up a shipment for him. The women insist on accompanying Boone, fearing he will abandon them. Jillian breaks down, upset about her daughter, but Boone assures her it will be alright and kisses her.

Boone and the women take a small boat to meet a freighter. The men on the freighter hold Boone, Jillian, and Lee at gunpoint, intending to collect the bounty. Boone tries to make a deal allowing the sailors to take the women to Cicero, but let him go free. Outraged, Jillian and Lee repeatedly hit Boone, to the amusement of the men on the ship. Meanwhile, K. C. sneaks onto the ship and holds a knife to the captain’s throat. Boone and the women escape with the cargo. While they are gone from Buddha's compound, Cicero sends helicopters to fire guns and launch grenades on the compound. Boone and the women return to find the place nearly destroyed. Buddha sends them away, saying Cicero’s men may return for them. He provides them a boat and tells Jillian he could not learn anything about her daughter’s whereabouts. Boone takes the women to a cave he uses as his headquarters. Boone and Jillian argue about finding Jaimie, but end up making love. At the Foundation compound, Sonya and her henchman, Gil, plot to kill Cicero, believing he is losing his grip on reality and will likely have them killed soon. Sonya and Gil make love. The next morning, Boone and the women sneak into Cicero’s compound and knock out several guards. When they are discovered, the rest of Cicero’s men shoot at them. Jillian goes to Cicero’s office demanding to know where her daughter is. He has no idea, but suggests Sonya knows. Cicero escapes from Jillian, but is knocked unconscious by Sonya and Gil, who take off in a helicopter. Cicero comes to and rushes to the helicopter, hanging onto the landing skid as it lifts off. Gil kicks Cicero’s hands and he falls to his death. Then Sonya shoots Gil, killing him. Boone flips a detonator switch and the helicopter explodes over the compound.

As the women prepare to leave the country, Jillian and Boone share a tender good-bye. Jillian invites him to look her up if he ever returns to America. As the women fly into Los Angeles International Airport, Jillian thanks K. C. and Lee for their help, then goes to meet the press. Just as she begins her press conference, Jillian hears a small voice call, “Mommy.” She turns to see Jaimie rushing to her. They hug and are happily reunited.

== Cast ==
- Nancy Allen as Jillian Grey
- Ted Shackelford as Boone
- Sal Landi as Gil
- Martin Landau as Cicero
- Michele Little as Lee
- Gina Gershon as K.C.
- Lotis Key as Sonya

== Production ==
The film was shot on location in the Philippines, with additional scenes shot in Bronson Canyon, Griffith Park, Los Angeles, California, USA.

== Release ==
After test screening at Pittsburgh in May 1987, Sweet Revenge opened on 11 September 1987 in limited release, earning $120,000 at thirty-four locations in its first three days of release.
