= RP612fic =

Yearly online alternative history event

#RP612fic is an alternative history storytelling event held in celebration of Philippine Independence Day every June 12, in which Filipino writers and other artists use Twitter to post tweet-length flash fiction.

The movement was started by Philippine Alternative Mythology writer Paolo Chikiamco in 2009. It is built around the #RP612fic hashtag, which is a reference to Philippine Independence day. RP stands for "Republic of the Philippines"; 612 refers to the date, June 12; and "fic" is simply short for Fiction.

== Common motifs ==
Common storytelling motifs include alternative Philippine history, in which Philippine history unfolds differently; alternative Filipino mythology in which historical or even contemporary news events are viewed from a mythological lens; and steampunk or dieselpunk reinterpretations of Philippine history, mythology, and even current affairs. Since its rise in popularity, another common story trend has been to simply insert pop culture references into historical events or the lives of historical personalities for humorous effect.

== History ==
Chikiamco started #RP612fic in 2009, its birth marked by "about a hundred stories" having been tweeted by participants who were mostly associated with the Philippine speculative fiction community, and a number of Manila-based readers' clubs Prominent participants and supporters in the first few years included prominent Philippine Speculative fiction writers Dean Francis Alfar, Adam David, Charles Tan, TJ Dimacali, Yvette Tan, and Eliza Victoria; romance writers Mina Esguerra, Ana Tejano, Anne Plaza, and Stella Torres; and graphic storytellers Gerry Alanguilan, Arnold Arre, Lyndon Gregorio, and Budjette Tan.

On June 8, 2011, Chikiamco organized a special run for RP612fic in support of the "Blog Action Day to save Philippine corals" which was spearheaded by Save Philippine Seas movement in response to news stories about the extent of illegal coral and turtle harvesting and export.

By its fourth regular run in 2012, #RP612fic was continuing to grow, and had started receiving mainstream media attention. By 2014, it had grown into a global phenomenon, regularly becoming a top Twitter trend in the Philippines during independence day celebrations. It became a number one Twitter trend worldwide in 2014, and again a global top trend the following year. The 2024 edition of the trend was seen as the largest in recent years.
