= Structural channel =

Type of beam

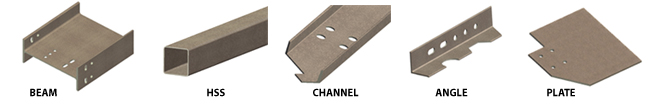
Various structural steel shapes

The structural channel, C-channel or parallel flange channel (PFC), is a type of (usually structural steel) beam, used primarily in building construction and civil engineering. Its cross section consists of a wide "web", usually but not always oriented vertically, and two "flanges" at the top and bottom of the web, only sticking out on one side of the web. It is distinguished from I-beam or H-beam or W-beam type steel cross sections in that those have flanges on both sides of the web.

== Uses ==
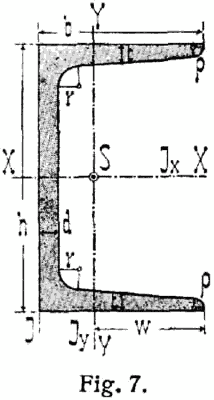
Cross-section.

The structural channel is not used as much in construction as symmetrical beams, in part because its bending axis is not centered on the width of the flanges. If a load is applied equally across its top, the beam will tend to twist away from the web. This may not be a weak point or problem for a particular design, but is a factor to be considered.

Channels or C-beams are often used where the flat, back side of the web can be mounted to another flat surface for maximum contact area. They are also sometimes welded together back-to-back to form a non-standard I-beam.

== See also ==
- Hollow structural section
