= 1975 Philippine Kabataang Barangay elections =

1975 youth council elections in the Philippines

Kabataang Barangay elections (KB) were held on May 1, 1975, in which about 3 million Filipino youths aged 15 to 18 years old participated. Each Barangay in the Philippines was mandated by law to have its own chapter of the Katipunan ng Kabataan in which the members elect their officers called as the Kabataang Barangay.

The Kabataang Barangay was created on April 15, 1975 by virtue of Presidential Decree No. 684. The decree provided for the organization of KB units in the 42,000 barangays all over the country with the purpose of giving the youth a definite role in community affairs and "ample opportunities to express their views that a complete cross-section of the will of the populace could be determined, thereby providing them a more democratic and popular basis for the legislation and/or other governmental operations."

The Kabataang Barangay is the youth legislature in every local village or community. It also initiates policies, programs and projects for the development of youth in their respective political territories. The Chairman of the Kabataang Barangay acts as the Chief Executive of the Sanggunian (Council) while the Kagawad (Councilor) as the legislative council. The Kagawads approve resolutions of the Sanggunian and appropriates the money allotted to the council, a share in the revenue of the Barangay.

The Chairman automatically sits in the Barangay as ex officio member. He automatically gets chairmanship of the Committee on Youth and Sports, one of the standing committees in the village council. Every Kabataang Barangay is then federated into municipal and city federations, then city and municipal federations are federated into a provincial federation.

The KB Chairman represents the barangay in the municipal or city federation. The presidents of the city and municipal federation presidents becomes member of the provincial federation and the provincial federation president. The presidents of highly urbanized and independent component cities composed the membership in the national federation and elect the national federation president who automatically sits in the Ministry of the Kabataang Barangay as ex officio member of the commission.

Except national federation, each level of the federation form municipal, city to provincial is governed by the Local Executive Committee composed mostly of the seven regularly elected officers of the federation.

== See also ==
- Commission on Elections
- Politics of the Philippines
- Philippine elections
- Sangguniang Kabataan
