= Janet Bordon =

Filipino actress (1955–2021)

- Born: Janet Cruz Bordon; September 16, 1955
- Died: September 22, 2021 (aged 66); San Francisco, U.S.
- Years active: 1977–1988

Janet Cruz Bordon (September 16, 1955 – September 22, 2021) was a Filipina actress active in the 1970s and 1980s. She was best known for the 1984 film Virgin People directed by Celso Ad. Castillo.

== Early life ==
Janet Cruz Bordon was born on September 16, 1955. She had two older sisters and three brothers. Janet graduated from St. Paul College obtaining a degree in psychology.

== Career ==
Film producer Jesse Ejercito scouted Janet Bordon who had just won the Miss Dial Girl contest at Manila's Five Prettiest. Ejercito convinced Bordon and her father to sign a contract with his Crown Seven Ventures for two years.

Bordon's first acting role was for the 1977 Crown Seven film Ako Si Emma, Babae! co-starring with Rudy Fernandez.

She also starred in Tatak ng Yazuka (1983) also with Fernandez; Biyak na Manyika (1979) with Phillip Salvador and Gloria Romero, Diegong Bayong (1984) with Anthony Alonzo; Virgin People (1984) with Pepsi Paloma and Myrna Castillo. Apat na Maria (1980) with Charo Santos and Lorna Tolentino. Her last film was the 1988 feature Moises Platon with Bong Revilla.

Bordon's father convinced her to end her acting career since she has been mostly receiving offers to appear in sexy films. This include Virgin People although her sister insist that intimate scenes involving Bordon actually utilized doubles.

== Later life and death ==
After her last film project, Bordon emigrated to the United States to join her family.

In her last 30 years, Bordon dealt with ovarian cancer. She underwent her last procedure at Stanford Hospital on August 29, 2021, with the doctors assessing that no surgery can mitigate her condition. She then died on September 22, 2021, at her residence in San Francisco.

== Personal life ==
Bordon had a single child, who grew up to be a lawyer.
