= Rod Navarro =

Filipino actor and politician (1930 – 2003)

- Born: Joseph Bowers Rigets; March 10, 1930; Manila, Insular Government of the Philippine Islands
- Died: April 9, 2003 (aged 73); Quezon City, Philippines
- Occupations: Actor; radio broadcaster
- Political party: Independent (2001)
- Other political affiliations: Kilusang Bagong Lipunan

Joseph Bowers Rigets (March 10, 1930 – April 9, 2003), better known by his stage name Rod Navarro, was a film and television actor. He was the host of Tawag ng Tanghalan.

Navarro was known as a character actor for playing rich dons, villains and for being "mahangin" (show off), a trademark in film and television to which he was known for, notably as Don Facundo in the Philippine sitcom Beh Bote Nga.

A Retired Master Sergeant in the Philippine Constabulary, he himself was a sharpshooter, which was evident in some of his films during the 1960s.

Navarro also served as a Councilor / Vice Mayor in Pasig, a Radio anchor and was a top product endorser during his time.

== Career ==
Navarro was known in the news industry and was known as the "dean of news commentators". He was a news anchor in DZMM-AM and a news commentator in DWAN-AM. He was also a broadcaster under the Radio Philippines Network together with other personalities like Noli de Castro and Joe Taruc.

== Filmography ==
Year	Title	Role	Notes
1955	Binibining Kalog	Jorge	The first movie he appeared in. Produced by Sampaguita Pictures.
1957	Pretty Boy		
1957	Prinsesa Gusgusin		
1958	Kundiman ng Puso		
1958	Lover Boy		
1960	Bilanggong Birhen		
1962	Kaming Mga Talyada		
1963	The Macapagal Story		
1963	Ang Mahal Ko'y Ikaw		
1963	Miting de Avance		
1964	Kardong Kidlat		
1964	Ginintuang Ani		
1964	Sa Bilis Walang Kaparis		
1964	Ang Pinakakilabot		
1964	Markong Bagsik		
1964	Zigomar		
1965	G-2		Part of the Agent 69 and Agent X-44 film series
1965	Kambal-Kidlat		
1965	Ang Maganda Kong Kapit-bahay		
1965	Batas ng .45		
1965	Kalaban ng Sindikato		Part of the Agent 69 and Agent X-44 film series
1965	Tatlo sa Tatlo		
1965	Interpol (International Police): Hadlang sa Manlulupig		Part of the Agent X-44 film series
1965	Ben Barracuda		"Initial Offering" of Junar Productions
1965	Contra-Señas		Part of the Agent X-44 film series
1965	Mastermind		Part of the Agent X-44 film series
1966	Deadline: Agosto 13		Guest performance; part of the Agent X-44 film series
1966	Pepe en Pilar		
1966	Makasalanan		
1966	Blackmail!		Part of the Agent X-44 film series
1966	Ang Nasasakdal		
1966	Doble Trece		
1966	Top Secret		Part of the Agent 69 film series
1966	Johnny West		
1966	Crossfire		
1966	Kidlat at Kamandag		
1966	Frame-Up!		Part of the Agent X-44 film series
1967	Sergeant .45	Sergeant .45	
1967	The Experts		Part of the Agent 69 film series
1967	Dahil sa Isang Bulaklak	Tony	
1967	Modus Operandi		Part of the Agent X-44 film series
1967	Sitsiritsit Alibangbang (Salaginto at Salagubang)		
1967	Da Best in Da West		
1968	Kaming Taga-ilog		
1968	Bigat ng Kamay		
1968	Armalite Commandos		
1968	Magnum Barracuda		
1968	Ang Banal, ang Ganid at ang Pusakal	Ang Ganid	
1968	Siete Dolores		
1968	Kaming Taga-bundok		
1969	The Graduation		
1969	Ang Sakristan		
1969	Ayun 'Yon, Eh!		
1969	Facifica Falayfay		
1969	Mekeni's Gold	Omar Sarap	
1969	Blue-Seal Mataharis		Part of the Agent X-44 series
1969	Kill: The Magnificent Agents!		
1970	Omar Cassidy and the Sandalyas Kid	Omar Cassidy	
1970	Agent Silencer at ang 7 Brassieres	Omar Bond Silencer/Agent 00-77	
1970	The Manhunt		
1970	Rodolfo Valentino		
1970	Ang Magsasaging		
1971	Laugh Story		
1971	The Criminals		Part of the Agent X-44 film series
1972	Laugh Bag		
1972	Sa Jeepney ang Hirap, sa Goodtime ang Sarap		"Initial Offering" of Avon Productions
1973	Kung Gumire Parang Tandang		
1973	Dracula Goes to R.P.		
1973	Fight Batman Fight!	Joker	
1974	As Long as There's Music		
1974	John & Marsha		
1974	Tama Na Erap		
1974	Ugat		
1974	King Khayam and I		
1975	The Exit		
1975	Jack and Jill and John		
1975	Langit Ko... ang Pag-ibig Mo		
1975	Nagbabagang Silangan		
1975	Huwag Mo Akong Paandaran		
1976	In My Little Room		
1976	The Lineman: Malikot Na Mata, Maraming Nakikita		
1979	Mahal... Saan Ka Nanggaling Kagabi?		
1979	Mahal... Ginagabi Ka Na Naman		
1979	Mamang Sorbetero		
1981	Hari ng Stunt		
1985	Magchumikap Ka!		
1986	John & Marsha '86: TNT sa Amerika		
1994	Walang Matigas Na Pulis sa Matinik Na Misis	Don Pedro	

== Death ==
Navarro died on April 9, 2003, due to prostate cancer. He was 73.
