= Lotis Key =

Filipino actress

Lotis Melisande Key is a former Filipino-American, multi-lingual, professional film and theater actress who starred in 85 major films in Asia. She was born and lives in the United States, although she spent her childhood traveling the world with her family. She was Vice President of the Minnesota Christian Writers Guild. She is the author of the novels, A Thing Devoted and A Song for the Wild Place. She adopted Wesley So, a U.S. Chess Champion and the first FIDE World Fischer Random Chess Champion.

== Career ==
She received FAMAS Award nominations as Best Supporting Actress for the movies Dalawang Mukha Ng Tagumpay (1973) and Ibigay Mo Sa Akin Ang Langit (1975). She worked with the likes of Ramon Zamora in Ang Mahiwagang Daigdig Ni Pedro Penduko (1973), Tony Ferrer in Kung Fu Master (1974), Chiquito in Enter Garote (1974), Eddie Garcia in Lady Luck (1975), George Estregan in Bamboo Trap (1975), and Dante Varona in Silakbo (1975).

Key made about 17 movies with Comedy King Dolphy including Captain Barbell (1973), Fung Ku (1973), Facundo Alitaftaf (1978), Darna, Kuno? (1979), Max En Jess (1979) and Bugoy (1979). Key worked with thoroughbred horses in Australia and Brunei and developed horse riding tours through rain forest areas.

In 1986, she moved to the U.S. and worked in industrial video, trade shows, TV commercials, theater, radio and on camera narration. She became a Christian theater director and writer. She wrote and produced plays that traveled all over the US the Philippines and Canada. In 2007, she also took a large team to the Philippines to present shows in under-privileged areas. From directing and producing theater she moved on to writing and apart from numerous magazine and newspaper articles has published two literary novels: A Song for the Wild Place and A Thing Devoted.

== Personal life ==
She is married to Renato "Bambi" Kabigting, a college basketball player for the Ateneo Blue Eagles and Crispa Redmanizers who went on to play for several professional Philippine Basketball Association teams including San Miguel, Alaska and Great Taste. They have a daughter, Abbey Key. Key is now based in Minnesota. In 2014, Key and husband Bambi Kabigting took chess grandmaster Wesley So into their family. Key serves as the adoptive mother and manager of So.

Weng Weng's brother said that Key is the only Filipino celebrity to attend his funeral in 1992.

== Selected filmography ==
- Manigong Bagong Taon TV New Year presentation Channel 5 Manila Starred Alan Martell, Hilda Koronel and Beautiful Lotis Key and directed by Lino Broka (1970)
- Stardoom (1971)
- Black Mama White Mama (1973)
- Ang Mahiwagang Daigdig Ni Pedro Penduko (1973)
- Fung Ku (1973)
- Fight Batman Fight! (1973)
- Captain Barbell (1973)
- Dalawang Mukha ng Tagumpay (1973)
- Return of the Dragon (1974)
- Kung Fu Master (1974)
- Biyenan Ko ang Aking Anak (1974)
- Walang Duwag sa Kayumanggi (1975)
- Sleeping Dragon (1975)
- Ibigay Mo sa Akin Ang Langit (1975)
- Meron Akong Nakita (1975)
- The Outside Man (1976)
- Karunungang Itim (1976)
- War Kami ng Misis Ko (1977)
- Mokong (1978)
- Facundo Alitaftaf (1978)
- Darna, Kuno? (1979)
- Max en Jess (1979)
- Bugoy (1979)
- Katawang Isinumpa (1982)
- Sweet Revenge (1987)
- Untamed Heart (1993)
- Laurel Avenue (1993)

== Books ==
- The Song for the Wild Place
- A Thing Devoted
