= SteelAsia =

Philippine steel company

- Formerly: Island Metal Manufacturing Corporation
- Type: Private
- Industry: Steel
- Founded: 1965; 61 years ago in Meycauayan, Philippines
- Founders: Benito Yao; Go Kim Pah
- Headquarters: Taguig, Metro Manila, Philippines
- Number of locations: 4 steel mills (2025)
- Area served: Luzon Batangas Bulacan Visayas Cebu Mindanao Davao
- Key people: Benjamin Yao, Chairman, President and CEO
- Products: Reinforcing steel bar
- Production output: 2.4 million tons per year (2020)
- Services: Rebar fabrication
- Owners: Yao family; Harrisburg Resources
- Website: www.steelasia.com

SteelAsia Manufacturing Corp. (SAMC), also known as SteelAsia, is a Philippine steel company based in Taguig, Metro Manila which is mainly a reinforcing steel bar producer.

== History ==
SteelAsia was established in 1965 by Benito Yao and Go Kim Pah, the latter being the founder of Equitable Banking Corporation. The company was founded as the Island Metal Manufacturing Corporation setting its first steel mill in Quezon City with the capacity of 30,000 tons per year.

In the 1980s, Benjamin Yao took over SteelAsia's operations. It would establish its second mill named Peninsula Steel in 1989 in Meycauayan, Bulacan. SteelAsia would establish a new steel bar mill in Bulacan in 1996 which introduced modern rolling mill technologies to the Philippine steel industry.

From the mid-2000s to the early 2010s, SteelAsia expanded its reinforcing bar production capacity; from producing 279,000 tons of rebar in 2006 to 1.2 million tons in 2013, securing almost half of the rebar market share in the Philippines. In 2014, it began operations of two steel mills in Mindanao, to serve the Mindanao region.

The company has also lobbied against the proliferation of induction furnace produced steel which it views as substandard and a detriment to the domestic steel industry. SteelAsia also started work on the Lemery Works which would be the first steel beam manufacturing facility in the Philippines upon its completion in 2023.

SteelAsia Manufacturing Corporation's Compostela, Cebu plant, CEO Ben Yao & Rafael Hidalgo exported P1.8 billion (35,000 metric tons) worth of green steel, high-strength rebar to a Canadian subway system in Vancouver. Acciona designed the 3-kilometer section of the Ontario Line subway. "We also supplied the bar for the Cebu–Cordova Link Expressway and the contractor was Acciona," Benjamin Yao said. Further, it obtained an P8.3-billion loan and government incentives for its P20-billion steel mill in Lemery, Batangas.

== Steel mills ==
SteelAsia operates four steel mills as of 2026.

Under-construction

- Lemery Works

Former

- Island Metal – Quezon City
- Peninsula Steel – Meycauayan, Bulacan
