= List of Philippine films of the 1970s =

A list of films produced in the Philippines in the 1970s. For an A-Z see Category:Philippine films.

Title	Director	Cast	Genre	Notes
1970
Mardy	Consuelo P. Osorio	Eddie Peregrina, Vilma Santos, Esperanza Fabon, Bebong Osorio	Action	
Let's Do It: The Las Vegas Way	Lauro Pacheco	Reycard Duet, Jean Lopez, Jimmy Morato, Jessica, Chicháy	Comedy, drama, musical	
Young Love	Tony Cayado	Nora Aunor, Tirso Cruz III, Vilma Santos, Edgar Mortiz, Ike Lozada	Romance, musical	
Tulak ng Bibig, Kabig ng Dibdib	Luciano B. Carlos	Dolphy, Nida Blanca, Panchito, Lucita Soriano, Rod Navarro	Comedy	
The Pushers	Nilo Saez	Tony Ferrer, Mary Ann Murphy, Rodolfo 'Boy' Garcia, Marissa Delgado, Bobby Velarde		
Master Stuntman	Jose Miranda Cruz	Dante Varona, Juvy Cachola		
Ricky Na, Tirso Pa!	Jose "Pepe" Wenceslao	Ricky Belmonte, Pilar Pilapil, Tirso Cruz III	Comedy, musical	
Teenage Jamboree	Artemio Marquez	Nora Aunor, Manny de Leon, Angelito Marquez, Lyn Salazar, Edgar Mortiz	Drama, romance	
I Dream of Jeanne	Artemio Marquez	Jeanne Young, Manny de Leon, Raul Aragon, Angelito Marquez	Comedy, fantasy, musical	
Kidnappers	Leody M. Diaz	Tony Ferrer, Divina Valencia, Leopoldo Salcedo, Van de León, Georgina Fairy		
Mga Hagibis	Luis Enriquez	Eddie Rodriguez, Vic Vargas, Jing Abalos, Renato Robles, Danny Rojo		
Totoy Guwapo	Chito B. Tapawan	Max Alvarado, Diana Dean, Verna Gaston, Eva Marie, Dolly Fuentes, Renato Robles, Rodolfo "Boy" Garcia	Action	
El Pinoy Matador	Cesar Gallardo	Dolphy, Pilar Pilapil, Panchito	Action, comedy, romance	
Omar Cassidy and the Sandalyas Kid	Luis San Juan	Rod Navarro, Marissa Delgado, Johnny Monteiro	Action, comedy, western	
Ang Matitinik	Pablo Santiago	Roberto Gonzalez, Bernard Belleza, Paquito Diaz, Dante Varona, Lito Garcia		
I Do Love You	Consuelo P. Osorio	Eddie Peregrina, Vilma Santos, Esperanza Fabon, Bebong Osorio	Drama, romance	
Hiwaga ng Lagim	Jose Miranda Cruz	Dante Varona, Rosanna Ortiz	Horror	
Tell Nora I Love Her	Artemio Marquez	Nora Aunor, Manny de Leon	Musical, romance	
James Bondat	Tony Cayado	Chiquito, Max Alvarado	Action	
Santiago!	Lino Brocka	Fernando Poe Jr., Dante Rivero	Period film	Set in World War II; first and only film of Poe and Brocka together
Beast of Blood	Eddie Romero	John Ashley, Celeste Yarnall, Eddie Garcia	Horror	
The Evil Within	Lamberto V. Avellana	Dev Anand, Kieu Chinh	Drama	India-Philippines co-production
The Hunted	Cesar J. Amigo	Charito Solis, Fred Galang, Alan Martell, Mario Monte	Action	
1971
Beast of the Yellow Night	Eddie Romero	John Ashley, Vic Diaz	Horror	
Pagdating sa Dulo	Ishmael Bernal	Rita Gomez, Vic Vargas, Eddie Garcia	Drama	
Always in My Heart	Mar S. Torres	Nora Aunor, Tirso Cruz III	Romance	
Asedillo	Celso Ad. Castillo	Fernando Poe Jr., Paquito Diaz, Barbara Perez, Jose Romulo	Action	
Apat Na Patak ng Dugo ni Adan	Pablo Santiago	Joseph Estrada, Zaldy Zshornack, Roberto Gonzalez	Action, drama	
1972
Ang Hiwaga ng Ibong Adarna	Pablo Santiago	Dolphy, Rosanna Ortiz, Panchito, Babalu	Action, adventure, comedy	
Magiting at Pusakal	Augusto Buenaventura	Fernando Poe Jr., Joseph Estrada, Rosanna Ortiz, Jeanne Young	Action, period film	Set during World War II
The Twilight People	Eddie Romero	John Ashley, Pat Woodell, Jan Merlin, Pam Grier	Adventure, horror, sci-fi	
Winter Holiday	José de Villa	Nora Aunor, Tirso Cruz III, Luis Gonzales	Romance	
The Woman Hunt	Eddie Romero	John Ashley, Pat Woodell, Sid Haig	Action, adventure, drama	
1973
Beyond Atlantis	Eddie Romero	Patrick Wayne, John Ashley, Leigh Christian, George Nader	Action, adventure, fantasy	
Ang Mahiwagang Daigdig ni Pedro Penduko	Celso Ad. Castillo	Ramon Zamora, Jeanny Young, Lotis Key, Eddie Garcia	Fantasy adventure	Topaz Film Productions
1974
Dynamite Wong and TNT Jackson	Cirio H. Santiago	Jeanne Bell, Chiquito, Stan Shaw, Max Alvarado	Blaxploitation	
Savage Sisters	Eddie Romero	Gloria Hendry, Cheri Cafarro, Rosanna Ortiz, John Ashley	Action, drama	
Bagsik at Kamandag ni Pedro Penduko	Jose 'Pepe' Wenceslao	Ramon Zamora, Lotis Key, Eddie Garcia, Panchito	Fantasy adventure	
Tinimbang Ka Ngunit Kulang	Lino Brocka	Christopher de Leon, Lolita Rodriguez, Mario O'Hara	Drama	
Fe, Esperanza, Caridad	Cirio H. Santiago; Gerardo de Leon; Lamberto V. Avellana	Nora Aunor	Action, comedy, Drama	
1975
Alat!	Pierre Salas	Tony Ferrer, George Estregan, Chanda Romero, Suzanne Gonzales	Action	
Araw-araw, Gabi-gabi	Danilo Cabreira	Charito Solis, Tony Santos, Sr., Rosanna Ortiz, Dindo Fernando	Drama	
Banaue: Stairway to the Sky	Gerardo de Leon	Nora Aunor, Christopher de Leon	Period Movie / Drama	
Batu-Bato sa Langit	Luciano B. Carlos	Nora Aunor, Christopher de Leon, Nida Blanca	Romance, comedy	
Darna vs. the Planet Women	Armando Garces	Vilma Santos, Rosanna Ortiz, Zandro Zamora, Bentot Jr., Eva Linda	Superhero	
Diligin Mo ng Hamog ang Uhaw Na Lupa	Augusto Buenaventura	Joseph Estrada, Gloria Diaz	Action	
Doctor, Doctor, I Am Sick!	Ading Fernando	Babalu, Rosanna Ortiz, Eddie Garcia, Edna Diaz, Dely Atay-Atayan, Tange, Paquito Salcedo, Ed Ramos, Florence Carvajal, Jun Cuenco	Comedy	
The Goodfather	Al Quinn	Dolphy, Boots Anson-Roa, Dolphy Jr., Rolly Quizon, Manny Boy Quizon, Freddie Quizon, Edgar Quizon, Sahlee Quizon	Comedy drama	
Kapitan Kulas	Romy Suzara	Ramon Revilla, Sr., Elizabeth Oropesa, Helen Gamboa, Walter Navarro	Action, drama	
Karugtong ang Kahapon	Fely Crisostomo	Vilma Santos, Edgar Mortiz, Eddie Garcia, Gloria Romero, Celia Rodriguez	Drama, romance	
Ang Magician: Tito the Great	F.H. Constantino	Chiquito, Eva Reyes, Leopoldo Salcedo, Rodolfo 'Boy' Garcia, Tange, Jose Garcia, Sandra de Veyra, Theresa Allan Dean	Comedy	
Manila in the Claws of Light	Lino Brocka	Rafael Roco, Hilda Koronel	Drama	Released in The Criterion Collection
Ang Nobya Kong Sexy	Cesar 'Chat' Gallardo	Joseph Estrada, Gloria Diaz, Paquito Diaz, Nympha Bonifacio, Subas Herrero, Mary Walter, Ruben Rustia, Jun Mariano, Marian Samson, Pedro Faustino	Romantic comedy	
Postcards from China	Cesar Gallardo	Dante Rivero, Boots Anson-Roa, Pilar Pilapil	Romance	
Sa Kagubatan ng Lunsod	Arsenio Bautista	Chanda Romero, George Estregan, Anna Gonzales, Perla Bautista, Vic Silayan, Ruben Rustia	Drama	
Siya'y Umalis, Siya'y Dumating	Mitos Villarreal	Marlene Dauden, Nestor de Villa	Drama	
1976
Ang Boyfriend Kong Baduy	Joey Gosiengfiao	Amalia Fuentes, Alona Alegre, Gina Pareño, Barbara Perez, Helen Gamboa, Orestes Ojeda	Comedy	
Hindi Kami Damong Ligaw	Danilo Cabreira	Charito Solis, Chanda Romero, Ronaldo Valdez, Marianne de la Riva, Ernie Garcia, Tony Santos Sr.	Drama	
Sakada	Behn Cervantes	Robert Arevalo, Hilda Koronel, Pancho Magalona, Rafael Roco Jr., Gloria Romero, Rosa Rosal, Tony Santos Sr.	Drama	
Iniibig Kita... Father Salvador	Pablo Santiago	Vic Vargas, Ricky Belmonte, Helen Gamboa, Leila Hermosa, Jean Abelgas	Drama	
Walang Karanasan	Arsenio Bautista	Alma Moreno, George Estregan, Eddie Garcia, Perla Bautista	Drama	
Babae... Sa Likod ng Salamin	Cesar J. Amigo	Charito Solis, Dindo Fernando, Alona Alegre, Perla Bautista	Drama	
Bato sa Buhangin	Pablo Santiago	Fernando Poe Jr., Vilma Santos	Romantic comedy	
Tatlong Taong Walang Diyos	Mario O'Hara	Nora Aunor	Period Movie / Drama	Set during World War II
Barok	F.H. Constantino	Chiquito, Trixia Gomez, Max Alvarado, Tange, Joaquin Fajardo, Palito, Arlene Sison, Ely Roque, Jun Santos, Norma Yumul, Manuel Dagul	Comedy	
Dateline Chicago: Arrest the Nurse Killer	Cesar Gallardo	Joseph Estrada, Pilar Pilapil, Mailyn Herrs, Garret Blake, J.C. Marshall, Debbie Brinson	Action	
Ganito Kami Noon... Paano Kayo Ngayon?	Eddie Romero	Christopher de Leon, Gloria Diaz, Eddie Garcia, Dranreb Belleza, Leopoldo Salcedo, Rosemarie Gil, Johnny Vicar, Tsing-Tong Tsai	Historical drama	Set in the Spanish colonization era
Insiang	Lino Brocka	Hilda Koronel, Mona Lisa, Ruel Vernal, Rez Cortez, Marlon Ramirez	Drama	Released in The Criterion Collection
The Interceptors	Efren C. Piñon	Tony Ferrer, Ramon Zamora, George Estregan, Edna Diaz, Paquito Diaz, Charlie Davao, Vic Diaz, Max Alvarado	Action	
Kisame Street	Ading Fernando	Dolphy, Nida Blanca, Panchito, Rolly Quizon, Katy dela Cruz, Patsy, Georgie Quizon, Bentot, Jr., Margie Braza, Teroy de Guzman	Comedy	
Makahiya at Talahib	Emmanuel Borlaza	Vilma Santos, Rudy Fernandez, Trixia Gomez, Gloria Romero, Romeo Rivera, Rocco Montalban, Robert Rivera, Max Alvarado	Drama	
Minsa'y Isang Gamu-gamo	Lupita Aquino-Kashiwahara	Nora Aunor, Jay Ilagan, Gloria Sevilla, Perla Bautista, Eddie Villamayor, Paquito Salcedo, Lily Miraflor, Leo Martinez, Nanding Fernandez, Luz Fernandez	Drama	A film criticizing the American existence in the Philippines
Puwede Ako, Puwede Ka Pa Ba?	Elwood Perez; Joey Gosiengfiao	Amalia Fuentes, Romeo Vasquez, Eddie Gutierrez, Vivian Velez, Rosemarie Gil, Ike Lozada, Inday Badiday, Cloyd Robinson, Lilian Laing, Sandy Garcia	Drama, romance	
The Rebel Hunter (True-to-Life Story of Brig. Gen. Romeo Gatan)	Jose Yandoc	Ramon Revilla, Sr., Boots Anson-Roa, George Estregan, Rodolfo 'Boy' Garcia, Rez Cortez, Max Alvarado	Action	
1977
Banta ng Kahapon	Eddie Romero	Vic Vargas, Rafael Roco, Jr., Roland Dantes, Chanda Romero	Action	
Sudden Death	Eddie Romero	Robert Conrad	Action	
Sinong Kapiling? Sinong Kasiping?	Eddie Romero	Gloria Diaz	Romance, drama	
Burlesk Queen	Celso Ad. Castillo	Vilma Santos, Rolly Quizon, Rosemarie Gil, Joonee Gamboa, Leopoldo Salcedo, Roldan Aquino, Chito Ponce Enrile, Dexter Doria, Yolanda Luna	Drama, romance	
Inay	Lino Brocka	Dindo Fernando, Chanda Romero, Orestes Ojeda, Laurice Guillen, Ace Vergel, Dexter Doria, Alicia Vergel	Comedy, drama	
Babae... Ngayon at Kailanman	Joey Gosiengfiao	Charito Solis, Gloria Diaz, Chanda Romero, Vivian Velez	Drama	
Bakya Mo Neneng	Augusto Buenaventura	Joseph Estrada, Nora Aunor, Tirso Cruz III, Gloria Sevilla, Angelo Castro, Jr., Ramon D' Salva, Angelo Ventura	Action, comedy, romance	
Mga Bilanggong Birhen	Mario O'Hara; Romy Suzara	Alma Moreno, Trixia Gomez, Rez Cortez, Armida Siguion-Reyna, Monang Carvajal, Leroy Salvador	Drama, romance	
Kung Mangarap Ka't Magising	Mike De Leon	Christopher de Leon, Hilda Koronel	Drama, music, romance	
Sa Dulo ng Kris	Cesar J. Amigo	Joseph Estrada, Vic Vargas, Inez Bond Manapul, Joe Cantada	Action drama	
Sa Piling ng Mga Sugapa	Gil Portes	Mat Ranillo III, Bembol Roco, Chanda Romero	Drama	
Walang Katapusang Tag-araw	Ishmael Bernal	Charito Solis, Mat Ranillo III, Eddie Garcia	Drama, romance	
1978
ABC ng Pag-ibig	Emmanuel Borlaza	Alma Moreno, Barbara Luna, Celia Rodriguez	Drama	
Atsay	Eddie Garcia	Nora Aunor, Ronald Corveau, Amy Austria, Armida Siguion-Reyna, Roldan Aquino, Renato Robles, Lilian Laing, Angie Ferro, Bella Flores	Drama	
Ex-Convict (Naligaw ng Landas)	Jun Gallardo	Rudy Fernandez, Alma Moreno, Trixia Gomez, Vivian Velez, George Estregan, Ruel Vernal, Anita Linda, Jose Garcia, Matimtiman Cruz, Arthur Moran	Action	
Facundo Alitaftaf	Luciano B. Carlos	Dolphy, Lotis Key, Trixia Gomez	Comedy	
Garrote: Jai Alai King	Manuel 'Fyke' Cinco	Christopher de Leon, Marianne dela Riva, Dranreb, Johnny Delgado, Amy Austria, Cynthia Gonzales, Allan Valenzuela, Manny Luna	Action, drama, sport	
Ang Huling Lalaki ng Baluarte	Artemio Marquez	Rey Malonzo, Tina Monasterio	Action	
Jack n' Jill of the Third Kind	Frank Gray Jr.	Dolphy, Nora Aunor, Rolly Quizon, Panchito, Paquito Diaz, Martin Marfil, Georgie Quizon, Max Vera	Comedy	
The Jess Lapid Story	Gallardo	Lito Lapid, Beth Bautista	Action	
Katawang Alabok	Emmanuel Borlaza	Robert Arevalo, Daisy Romualdez, Orestes Ojeda, Janet Bordon, Vic Silayan, Lorna Tolentino, Manny Luna, Anita Linda, Lucita Soriano	Drama	
Kid Kaliwete	Manuel 'Fyke' Cinco	Bembol Roco, George Estregan, Trixia Gomez, Jean Saburit, Joonee Gamboa, Cynthia Gonzales, Val Iglesias	Action, sport	
Mercenario	Manuel Cinco	Vic Vargas, Chanda Romero, Jean Saburit, Charlie Davao, Ingrid Salas, Lito Anzures, Ernie Ortega, Tsing Tong Tsai, Jose Romulo, Angelo Ventura	Action	
Napoleon Agra (Mad Killer ng Caloocan)	José Yandóc	Ramon Revilla, Susan Valdez, Rez Cortez, Nick Romano	Action	
Paano ang Gabi Kung Wala Ka?	Leonardo L. Garcia	Lorna Tolentino, George Estregan, Manny Luna, Ronald Corveau, Laila Dee Rodolfo 'Boy' Garcia	Romantic drama	
Pagputi ng Uwak, Pag-itim ng Tagak	Celso Ad. Castillo	Vilma Santos, Bembol Roco	Drama, romance	
Pinagbuklod ng Pag-ibig	Leonardo L. Garcia	Romeo Vasquez, Nora Aunor, Tirso Cruz III, Vilma Santos, Jessica, Rodolfo 'Boy' Garcia, Romnick Sarmenta, Zandro Zamora, Odette Khan, Franco Guerrero	Drama, romance	
Rubia Servios	Lino Brocka	Vilma Santos, Mat Ranillo III, Phillip Salvador	Drama	
Salonga	Romy Suzara	Rudy Fernandez, George Estregan, Trixia Gomez, Ruel Vernal, Raul Aragon, Dencio Padilla, Amy Austria, Rodolfo 'Boy' Garcia, Jose Romulo, Veronica Jones	Action, drama	
1979
Sabotage 2	Efren C. Piñon	Tony Ferrer, Azenith Briones	Spy film	One of the last installments in the Agent X-44 film series
Ina, Kapatid, Anak	Lino Brocka	Lolita Rodriguez, Charito Solis, Rio Locsin, Ric Rodrigo, Raul Aragon	Drama	
Jaguar	Lino Brocka	Phillip Salvador, Amy Austria, Johnny Delgado	Crime, drama	Entered into the 1980 Cannes Film Festival
Kasal-Kasalan, Bahay-Bahayan	Pablo Santiago	Nora Aunor, Christopher de Leon, Alma Moreno, Rudy Fernandez, Rebecca Gonzales, Lito Anzures, Jose Garcia, Matimtiman Cruz, German Moreno	Comedy, romance	
Al Magat's Mang Kepweng	F.H. Constantino	Chiquito, Tito Sotto, Myrna Velasco	Comedy	
Alabok na Ginto	Dr. Antonio C. Martinez	Roel Vergel de Dios, Veronica Jones, Allan Valenzuela, Anita Linda, Ruben Rustia, Renato Del Prado, Joe Garcia	Romance, War	
Ang Alamat ni Julian Makabayan	Celso Ad. Castillo	Christopher de Leon, Charo Santos, Eddie Garcia, Perla Bautista, Johnny Delgado, Lilibeth Ranillo, Celso Ad. Castillo, Tony Santos Sr.	Action	
Angelita... Ako Ang Iyong Ina	Lauro Pacheco	Susan Roces, Julie Vega	Drama	
Annie Batungbakal	Maryo J. de los Reyes	Nora Aunor, Lloyd Samartino, Rez Cortez, Chichay, Juan Rodrigo	Comedy, romance	
Bugoy	Jett C. Espiritu	Dolphy, Lotis Key, Panchito, Paquito Diaz, Max Alvarado, Ernie Ortega, Conde Ubaldo, Hero Bautista	Comedy	
Darna, Kuno...?	Luciano B. Carlos	Dolphy, Lotis Key, Brenda Del Rio	Parody	
Diborsyada	Elwood Perez	Gina Alajar	Drama	
Ina Ka ng Anak Mo	Lino Brocka	Nora Aunor, Lolita Rodriguez, Raul Aragon	Drama	The first and the only collaboration of Aunor and Rodriguez
Kadete	Emmanuel Borlaza	Jay Ilagan, Ronald Corveau, Rez Cortez, Anna Marin, Fred Montilla, Rosemarie Gil, Alicia Alonzo, Anita Linda, Romeo Rivera, Dino Kortes, Michael de Mesa, Marissa del Mar	Drama	
Ang Lihim ng Guadalupe	Armando A. Herrera	Fernando Poe, Jr., Tina Monasterio, Yvette Christine, Paquito Diaz, Lito Anzures, Vic Diaz, Romy Diaz, Bentot, Jr., Max Alvarado	Adventure	
Mamang Sorbertero	Augusto Buenaventura	Joseph Estrada, Celeste Legaspi, Rod Navarro, Dencio Padilla, Subas Herrero, Quiel Segovia, Vic Sotto, Veronica Palileo		
Modelong Tanso	Cirio H. Santiago	Charito Solis, Vilma Santos	Drama	
Ang Sisiw ay Isang Agila	Jun Gallardo	Lito Lapid, George Estregan, Dante Varona, David Aguila, Julie Ann Fortich, Lucita Soriano, Teroy de Guzman, Yoyoy Villame	Action, adventure	
Stepsisters	Elwood Perez	Lorna Tolentino, Rio Locsin	Drama	
Who Invented the Yoyo? Who Invented the Moon Buggy?	Kidlat Tahimik	Kidlat Tahimik, Kidlat de Guia	Comedy	Filipino-West German co-production
