= Independence Day (Philippines) =

National holiday in the Philippines

Independence Day Araw ng Kasarinlán
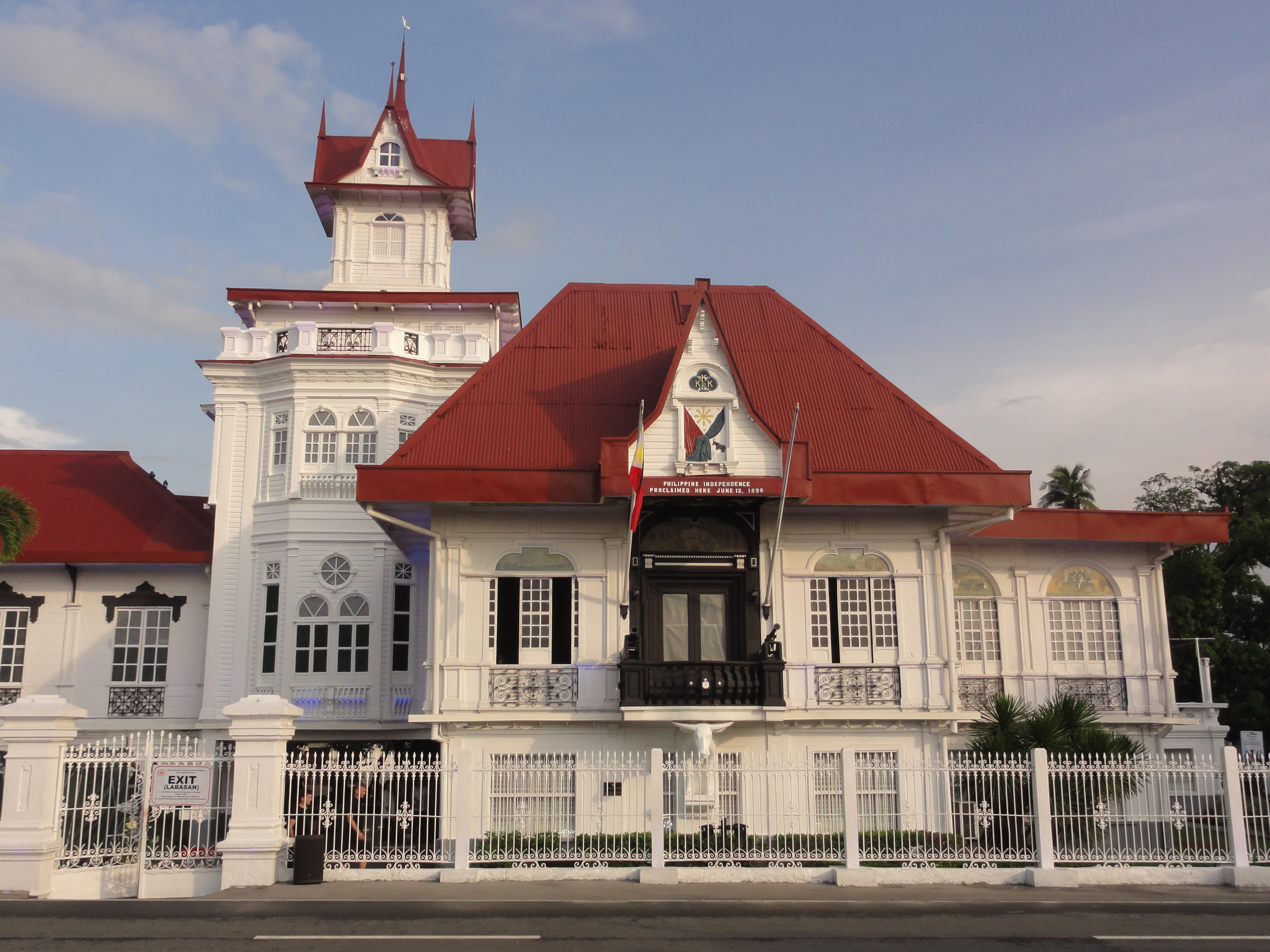
- Aguinaldo Shrine, where Emilio Aguinaldo declared the country's independence from Spain
- Official name: Araw ng Kasarinlán
- Also called: Araw ng Kalayaan
- Observed by: Philippines
- Type: National day
- Significance: Declaring Philippine independence from Spain
- Date: June 12
- Next time: June 12, 2027
- Frequency: Annual
- Related to: Republic Day

Independence Day (Filipino: Araw ng Kasarinlán; also known as Araw ng Kalayaan, "Day of Freedom") is a national holiday in the Philippines observed annually on June 12, commemorating the declaration of Philippine independence from Spain in 1898. Since 1978, it has been the country's national day.

== History ==
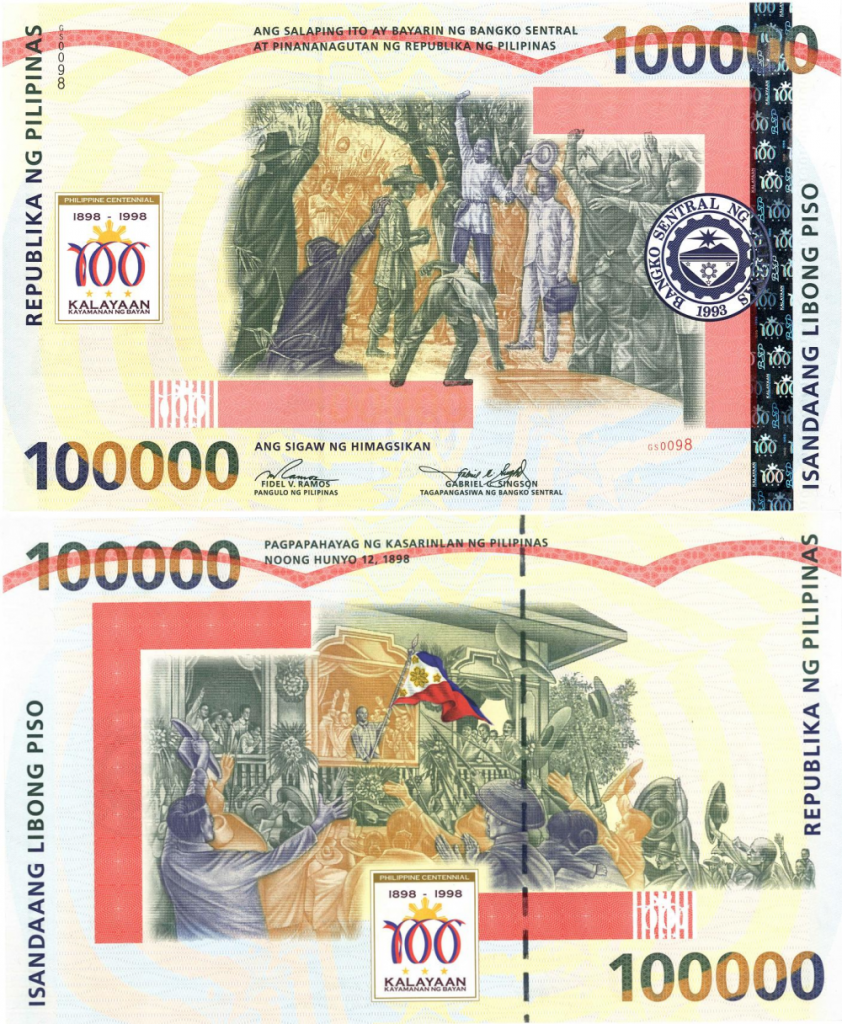
The Proclamation of Independence on June 12, 1898, as depicted on the reverse side of the ₱100,000 commemorative banknote in celebration of the centennial of Philippine independence in 1998

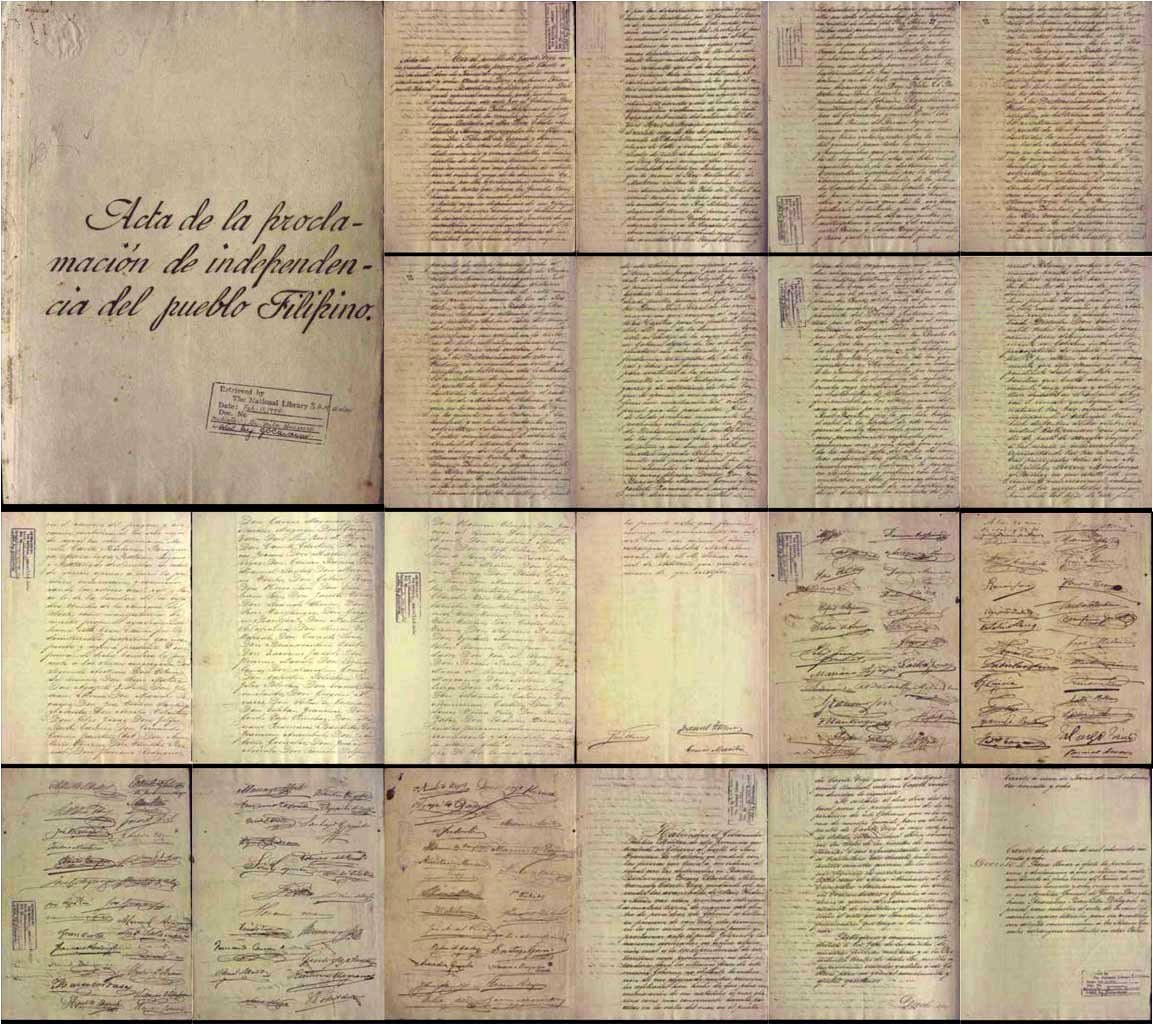
The Declaration of Independence document written by Ambrosio Rianzares Bautista

The earliest recorded event related to the holiday was when Andres Bonifacio, along with Emilio Jacinto, Restituto Javier, Guillermo Masangkay, Aurelio Tolentino, Faustino Manalak, Pedro Zabala, and few other Katipuneros went to Pamitinan Cave in Montalban (now Rodriguez, Rizal) to initiate new members of the Katipunan. Bonifacio wrote Viva la independencia Filipina! or Long Live Philippine independence on walls of the cave after the Spanish discovery of the revolutionary group. Bonifacio also led the Cry of Pugad Lawin, which signals the beginning of the Philippine Revolution. Members of the Katipunan, led by Bonifacio, tore their community tax certificates (cedulas personales) in protest of Spanish conquest.

The Philippine Revolution began in 1896. The Pact of Biak-na-Bato, signed on December 14, 1897, established a truce between the Spanish colonial government and the Filipino revolutionaries. Under its terms, Emilio Aguinaldo and other revolutionary leaders went into exile in Hong Kong after receiving $MXN400,000 (Note: The Mexican dollar at the time was worth about 50 US cents, equivalent to about $19.35 today.) from the Spanish Government.

At the outbreak of the Spanish–American War, Commodore George Dewey sailed from Hong Kong to Manila Bay leading the US Navy Asiatic Squadron. On May 1, 1898, Dewey defeated the Spanish in the Battle of Manila Bay, effectively placing the Spanish capital under US control. Later that month, the US Navy transported Aguinaldo back to the Philippines. Aguinaldo arrived on May 19, 1898 in Cavite.

On June 5, 1898, Aguinaldo issued a decree at his house located in what was then known as Cavite El Viejo proclaiming June 12, 1898 as the day of independence. The Acta de la Proclamacion de la Independencia del Pueblo Filipino was solemnly read by its author, Ambrosio Rianzares Bautista, Aguinaldo's war counselor and special delegate. The 21-page declaration was signed by 98 people appointed by Aguinaldo, including a U.S. citizen not acting in any official capacity, L. M. Johnson, who had represented himself to Aguinaldo as Late Colonel and Artillery Inspector, Imperial Chinese Army. The Philippine flag was officially unfurled for the first time at about 4:30 p.m, as the Marcha Nacional Filipina was played by the band of San Francisco de Malabon.

Independence was ratified in Bacoor by 190 municipal presidents from the 16 provinces liberated by August 1, 1898, and was ratified again by the Malolos Congress, a partly elected and partly appointed body representing all constituencies of the Philippines.

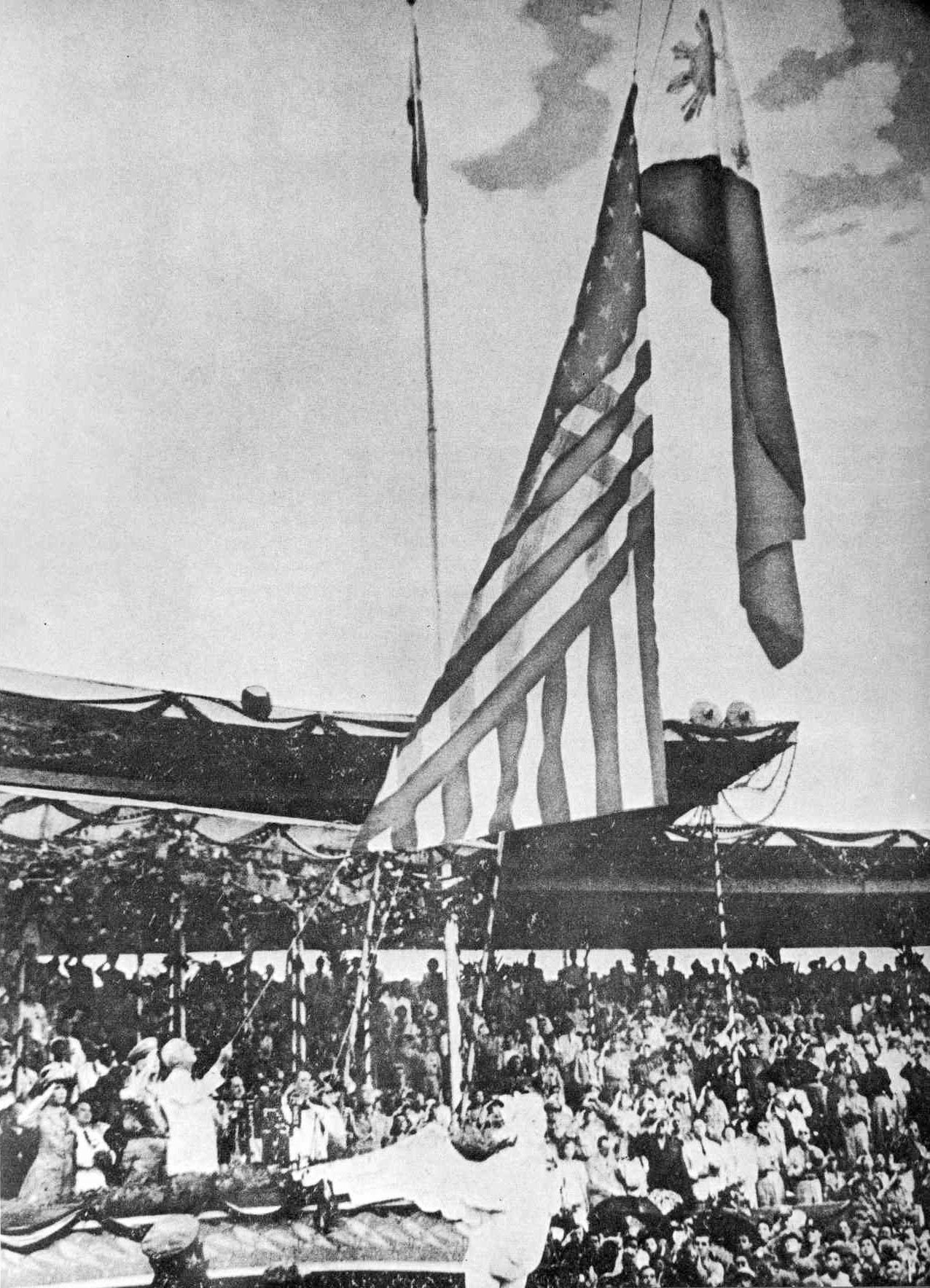
The flag of the United States is lowered, while the flag of the Philippines is raised during the Independence Day ceremony on July 4, 1946 at the Independence Grandstand in Manila.

The Philippines failed to win international recognition of its independence — specifically not from either the United States of America or Spain. The Spanish government later ceded control over the Philippines to the United States in the 1898 Treaty of Paris, in which Filipino representative Felipe Agoncillo was denied entry, and in spite of Filipino control over large portions of the islands. The Revolutionary Government of the Philippines and later the democratically constituted First Philippine Republic did not recognize the treaty, leading to the outbreak of the Philippine–American War with the US over the latter's assertions of sovereignty over the islands.

The US government recognized the independence of the Philippines on July 4, 1946. In accordance with the Philippine Independence Act (more popularly known as the "Tydings–McDuffie Act"), in which Filipinos ratified a constitution and voted for independence, President Harry S. Truman issued Proclamation 2695 of July 4, 1946, officially recognizing the independence of the Philippines. On the same day, the Treaty of Manila was signed.

July 4 was chosen as the date by the United States because it corresponds to the United States' Independence Day, and that day was observed in the Philippines as Independence Day until 1962. On May 12, 1962, in response to the US government's failure to approve a payment of $72 million in war damages, President Diosdado Macapagal issued Presidential Proclamation No. 28, which declared June 12 a special public holiday throughout the Philippines, "... in commemoration of our people's declaration of their inherent and inalienable right to freedom and independence." On August 4, 1964, Republic Act No. 4166 renamed July 4 holiday as "Philippine Republic Day", proclaimed June 12 as "Philippine Independence Day", and enjoined all citizens of the Philippines to observe the latter with befitting rites.

== Flag Day ==
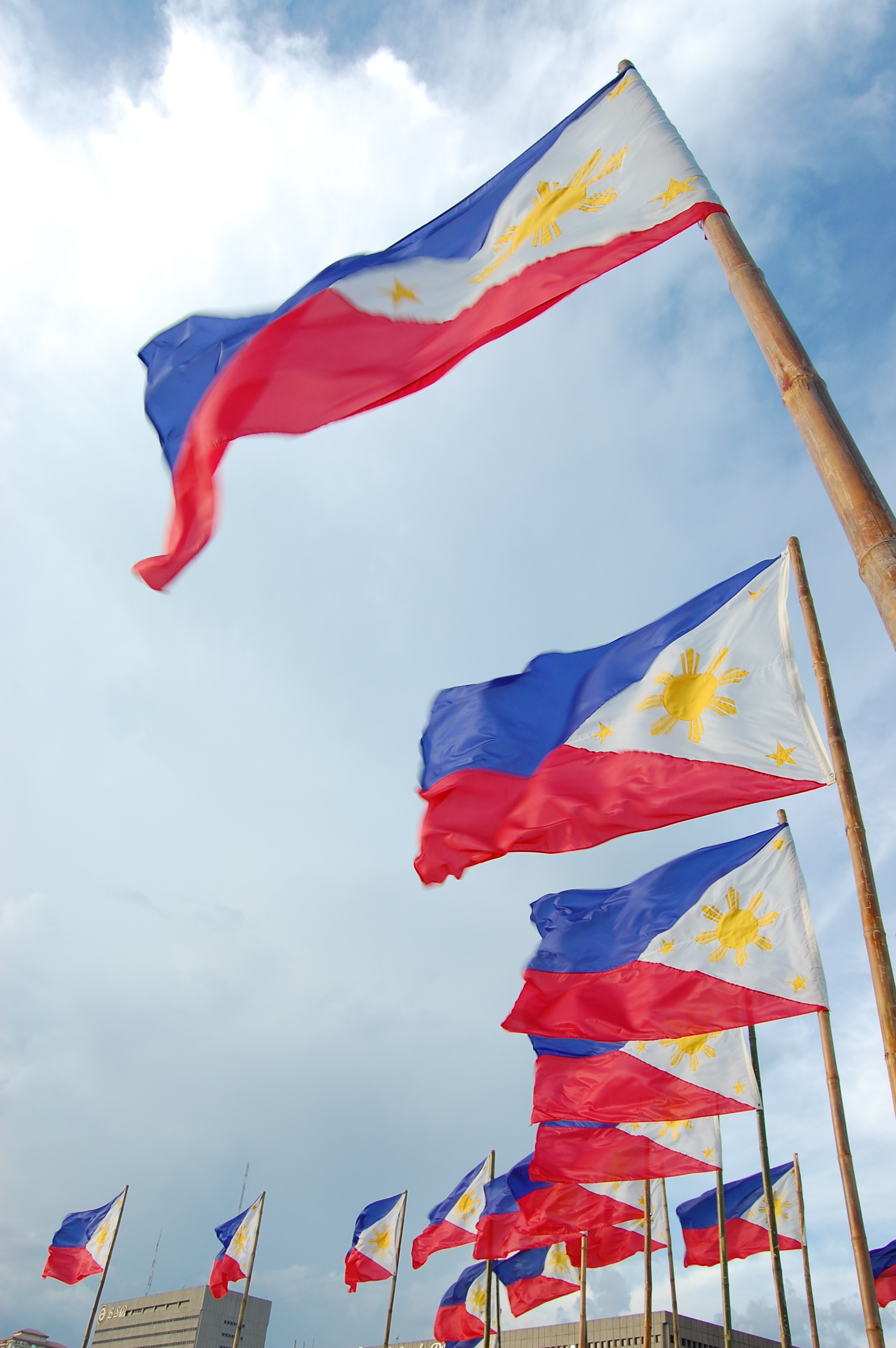
Philippine flags on display

Prior to 1964, June 12 was observed as Flag Day in the country. In 1965, President Diosdado Macapagal issued Proclamation No. 374, which moved National Flag Day to May 28 (the date the Philippine flag was first flown in the victory by Filipino forces in the Battle of Alapan located in Imus, Cavite in 1898). In 1994, President Fidel V. Ramos issued Executive Order No. 179, extending the celebration period from May 28 to Philippine Independence Day on June 12, ordering government departments, agencies, offices, government owned and controlled corporations, state agencies, and local government units, and even private establishments, to prominently display the national flag in all public buildings, government institutions, and official residences during this period; ordering the Department of Education, in coordination with the private sector, non-government organizations, and socio-civic groups, to enjoin the prominent display of the national flag in all public squares and, whenever practicable, in all private buildings and homes in celebration of national independence.

== Holiday customs ==
A wreath-laying ceremony is conducted by the President at the Rizal Monument after the flag of the Philippines is raised.

Kawit, Cavite holds a yearly commemorative act with the flag raising at the Aguinaldo Shrine and the reading of the Philippine Declaration of Independence. Worldwide, Filipinos gather on June 12 or a date close to it to publicly celebrate, sometimes with a parade. There are also local celebrations as well, with a national celebration in the capital of Manila, which in past years included a civil-military parade of uniformed organizations and public and private entities. The last major parade was held in 2018 to mark the 120th year of nationhood.

== See also ==
- List of national independence days
- Philippine Independence Day Parade
- #RP612fic – a social media event held every Philippine Independence Day since 2009
