= 1980 in the Philippines =

- Decades: 1960s; 1970s; 1980s; 1990s; 2000s
- See also: List of years in the Philippines; films

1980 in the Philippines details events of note that happened in the Philippines in the year 1980.

== Incumbents ==
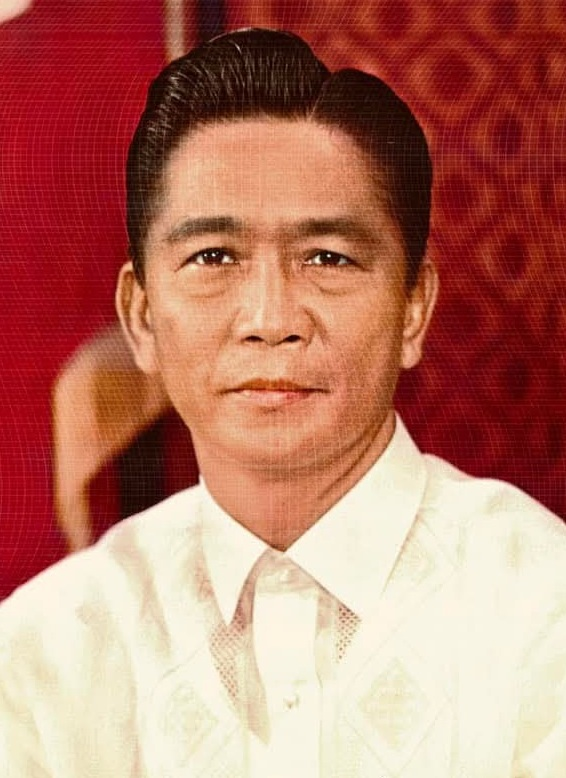
Ferdinand E.
Marcos Sr.

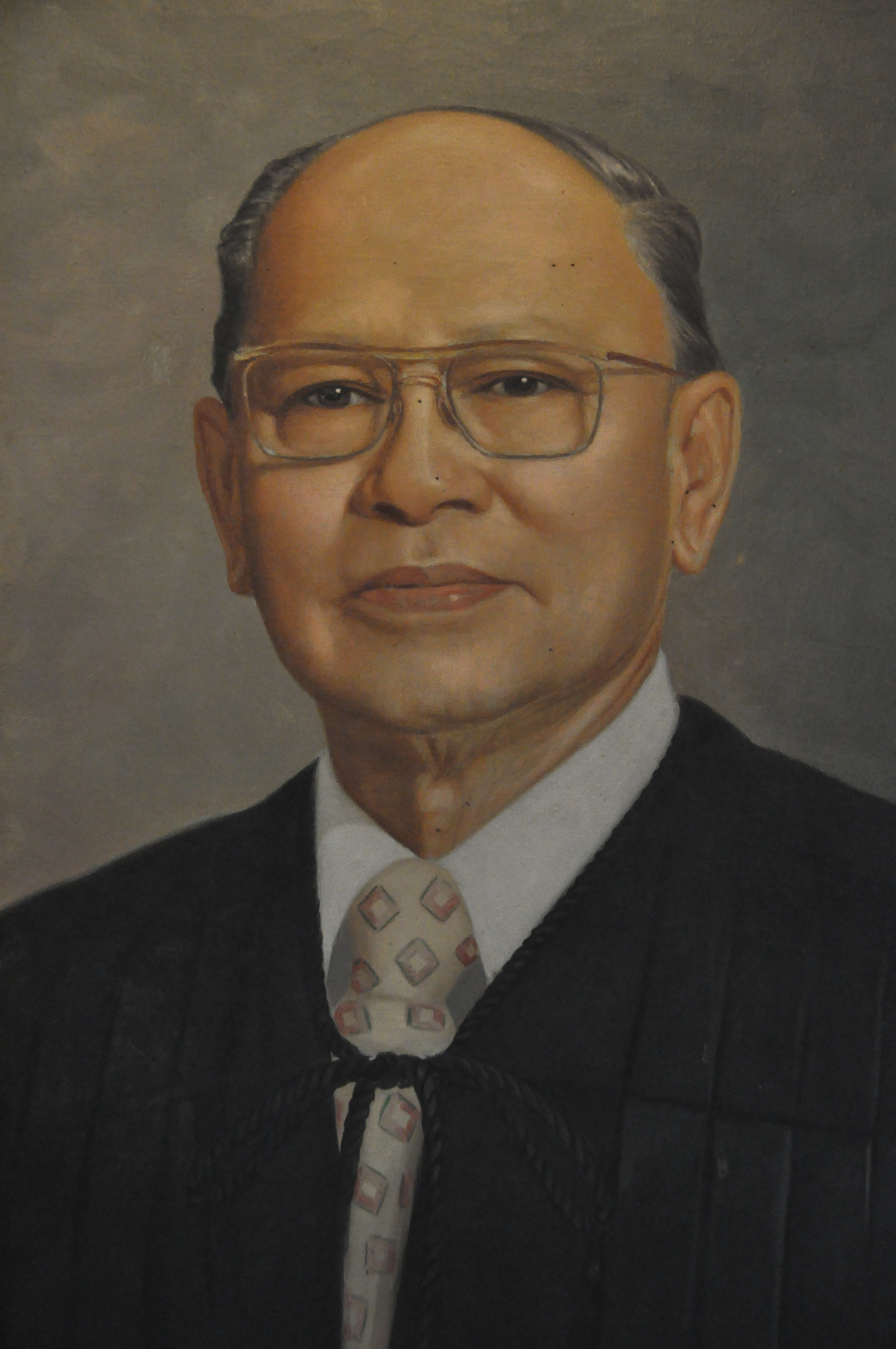
Querube C.
Makalintal

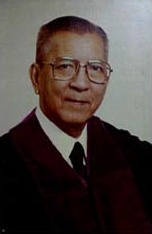
Enrique M.
Fernando

- President: Ferdinand Marcos (KBL)
- Prime Minister: Ferdinand Marcos (KBL)
- House Speaker: Querube Makalintal
- Chief Justice: Enrique Fernando

== Events ==
=== January ===
- January 30 – The nation's first local elections in the martial law era are held, except in three municipalities in Sulu where voting is suspended. The administration party Kilusang Bagong Lipunan (New Society Movement), having the only full national slate for the local seats, wins almost all of these including all in Metro Manila. Since the campaign period, 19 deaths are reported.

=== February ===
- Military operations against the religious cult Salvatorre begin in Negros following the latter's attacks on villages and plantations in the island, particularly the burning of at least eleven villages in Negros Occidental. Deadly clashes take place in two provinces until March.
- Grenade attacks in Davao and Cotabato provinces kills seven and injures 150.
- February 23:
  - A grenade attack at a market in Toril, Davao City, kills two and injures fifty.
  - Three hours later, another grenade attack during a governor's party at a town plaza in front of the provincial capitol in Mati, Davao Oriental, kills two and injures fifty-four.

=== March ===
- March 7 – An attack on a logging convoy north of Zamboanga City kills at least 13 lumberjacks and security men, and injures 14 others.
- March 9 – Grenade attacks by suspected Moslem separatists occur in two cities in Mindanao; the worst during the martial law era. Deaths and injuries range from 21–35 and 237–283, respectively.
  - Hand grenades thrown into two of four movie theaters in Ozamiz, Misamis Occidental, explode, killing 16 and injuring 120.
  - About 5 hours later, a grenade explosion in a town plaza in Iligan during an outdoor singing contest kills 8–10 and injures 117. A grenade in the city police headquarters fails to explode. One of at least six suspected bombers is later arrested.
- March 11 – A grenade explosion in a residence of a local leader of Kilusang Bagong Lipunan in M'lang, Cotabato, kills one and injures 16.
- March 29 or 30 – A gang of armed pirates attacks Filipino refugees, fleeing from fighting in the southern Philippines, off Danawan Island, Sabah, Malaysia. Ten are killed and eleven others are injured.

=== April ===
- April 13 – Suspected Moslem rebels toss grenades to the crowd witnessing the blaze they have set and sweeping through a shopping area of Pagadian, Zamboanga del Sur, killing 13 and injuring 140.
- April 22 – Passenger ship MV Don Juan bound for Bacolod City sinks in Tablas Strait, 20 nautical miles (37 km) off Maestre de Campo Island, Romblon after colliding with the oil tanker M/T Tacloban City. Reported casualties were 18 dead and 115 missing, with 745 survivors.

=== May ===
- May 1 – Kilusang Mayo Uno (May First Movement) is organized.
- May 8 – Detained former Senator Benigno Aquino Jr. is released from detention after being allowed, with conditions, and flies to Texas, United States, to undergo heart bypass surgery.
- May 26 – The Kabataang Barangay elections (KB) were held. About 3 million Filipino youths aged 15 to 18 years old participated.

=== June ===
- June 4 – A commando raid in Cabanatuan, Nueva Ecija, and a failed assassination attempt on city mayor Honorato Perez, leaves nine persons dead and more than a dozen injured.

=== July ===
- July 14 – The police announces the dismantling of a fanatical religious sect of mountain tribesmen known as Salvatoris, as well having killed some 100 cult members. This follows the surrender of more than 300 cultists in Kabankalan, Negros Occidental, on July 11—the largest batch—in addition to about 350 others earlier. The cult, operating in nine towns of the province, has been implicated in a series of attacks in Visayas; and has killed 100 civilians since its establishment in Negros in 1978. Its founder, preacher Alfredo Salvatori, has reportedly returned to Mindanao.

=== September ===
- September 12 – Eight mid-afternoon explosions, reportedly set off by urban guerrillas, strike seven government and commercial buildings in the Metro Manila's worst in the martial law era. An American woman is killed in a department store in Makati, while 33, including three other foreigners, are injured. A group called the April 6 Liberation Movement claims responsibility.

=== October ===
- October 19 – A bomb explosion occurred at the Philippine International Convention Center during the opening ceremonies of the American Society of Travel Agents congress, just after President Marcos' welcome speech; 18 individuals are injured. This leads to the cancellation of the scheduled six-day meeting.
- October 20 – President Marcos orders the arrest of thirty individuals, including former senator Aquino and nine other political opponents having been forced to live in the United States due to the country's political environment, which he claimed having connections with the April 6 Liberation Movement, an underground group that has claimed responsibility for nearly all the bombings since August until a day prior.

=== November ===
- November 8–9 – President Marcos issues proclamations declaring a state of public calamity in the provinces of Aurora, Cagayan, Ifugao, Isabela, Kalinga-Apayao, La Union, Nueva Ecija, Nueva Vizcaya, Pangasinan, Quirino, Tarlac, and parts of Bulacan and Pampanga, due to the effects of Typhoon Betty (Aring). The cyclone has hit Luzon on November 4, and has killed more than 50 people in a landslide in Santa Fe, Nueva Vizcaya.

=== December ===
- December 13 – New People's Army rebels ambush a passenger jeep in Davao City, killing 13 police constables and 5 civilians.
- December 24 – Passenger ferry Alfredo, carrying more than 250 individuals, capsizes; 117 are rescued while the death toll is 29.

== Holidays ==
Letter of Instruction No. 814, issued by President Marcos in 1979 that provided guidelines for observation of holidays, remained in effect until being repealed by Letter of Instruction No. 1087, issued on November 26, providing revised guidelines for these observances.

Compared to the previous one, the new letter strictly mandated that when a legal holiday fell on a Sunday, only a proclamation was required to declare the following Monday a special public holiday. Moreover, this was the first time December 31 was designated the Last Day of the Year starting that year.

Meanwhile, in early April, President Marcos signed a proclamation declaring May 6 as Araw ng Kagitingan; consolidating the celebration of the Fall of Bataan, Fall of Corregidor and Battle of Bessang Pass; and designating April 9 a regular working day. A month later, May 6 was declared a special public holiday. The designation of April 9 of that year as Bataan Day would be the last, as it was then moved to May 6, which then became a legal public holiday effective in 1981.

Legal public holidays

- January 1 – New Year's Day
- April 3 – Maundy Thursday
- April 4 – Good Friday
- April 9 – Bataan Day (later declared a regular working day)
- May 1 – Labor Day
- June 12 – Independence Day
- July 4 – Filipino-American Friendship Day
- August 31 – National Heroes Day
- November 30 – Bonifacio Day
- December 25 – Christmas Day
- December 30 – Rizal Day

Nationwide special holidays

- January 29–31 – additional holidays in line with the nationwide local elections on January 30
- April 5 – Holy Saturday
- May 6 – Araw ng Kagitingan
- September 11 – Barangay Day
- September 22 – in line with the Thanksgiving Day as September 21 fell on a Sunday
- October 31 – additional holiday
- November 1 – All Saints Day
- December 26–27 – additional holidays
- December 31 – Last Day of the Year

== Entertainment and culture ==
=== Unknown ===
- October - The religious show Ang Dating Daan starts its radio broadcast through DWWA.

== Births ==
=== January ===
- January 15 – Sam Oh, TV host and radio DJ
- January 16 – Drew Arellano, TV host and actor
- January 20 – Jaybee Sebastian, high profile inmate at New Bilibid Prison (d. 2020)
- January 25 – Nikki Valdez, actress and singer

=== February ===
- February 7 – Adrian Alandy, actor
- February 8 – Jenny Miller, Canadian-Filipino actress
- February 16 – Mark Lapid, actor and politician

=== March ===
- March 1 – Cassandra Ponti, actress, dancer, and model
- March 3 – Christian Coronel, basketball player
- March 7 – Froilan Baguion, basketball player
- March 11 – Yancy de Ocampo, basketball player

=== April ===
- April 23 – Bobby Pacquiao, boxer and politician
- April 27 – Jason Gainza, actor and comedian

=== May ===
- May 13 – Mau Marcelo, singer
- May 20 – Hayden Kho, cosmetic surgeon and entrepreneur
- May 29 – Migui Moreno, actor, musician, TV commercial and Member of Idolzone

=== June ===
- June 1 – Ryan Luis Singson, politician
- June 16 – Philip Butel, basketball player
- June 24 - Wacky Kiray, actor, host and comedian

=== July ===
- July 2 – Ciara Sotto, actress and singer
- July 6 – JB Magsaysay, actor, businessman and politician
- July 24 – Cheska Garcia, actress and model

=== August ===
- August 2 – Dingdong Dantes, actor
- August 9 – Kristopher Peralta, actor
- August 17 – Tootsie Guevara, singer
- August 19 – Cyrus Baguio. basketball player

=== September ===
- September 16 – Kitchie Nadal singer, songwriter

=== October ===
- October 1 – Phoemela Baranda, television personality
- October 6 – Larijean Moreno, actress
- October 11 – Justin Cuyugan, actor
- October 17 – Don Dulay, basketball player
- October 30 – Rich Alvarez, basketball player and coach

=== November ===
- November 1 – Nina, singer
- November 10 – Mike Cortez, basketball player
- November 27 – Dan Campilan, television journalist (d. 2006)

=== December ===
- December 2 – Thor, singer

== Deaths ==
- January 26 – Cecilio Putong, educator, writer, and author (b. 1891)
- February 24 – Jorge B. Vargas, lawyer and diplomat (b. 1890)
- December 12 – Severino Montano, actor, director and playwright (b. 1915)
- December 16 – Jose B. Lingad, lawyer and politician who served as governor and congressman from Pampanga (b. 1914)
