= Rudy Fernandez =

Rudy or Rodolfo Fernandez may refer to:

- Rudy Fernandez (actor) (1952–2008), Filipino actor
- Rudy Fernández (baseball) (1911–2000), Cuban baseball player and manager
- Rudy Fernández (basketball) (born 1985), Spanish basketball player
- Rudy Fernandez (labor leader) (1927–1979), Filipino trade unionist
- Rudy Fernandez (triathlete) (1947–2022), Filipino triathlete
- Rodolfo Fernández (footballer) (born 1979), Paraguayan footballer
