= 1979 in the Philippines =

- Decades: 1950s; 1960s; 1970s; 1980s; 1990s
- See also: List of years in the Philippines; films

1979 in the Philippines details events of note that happened in the Philippines in the year 1979.

== Incumbents ==
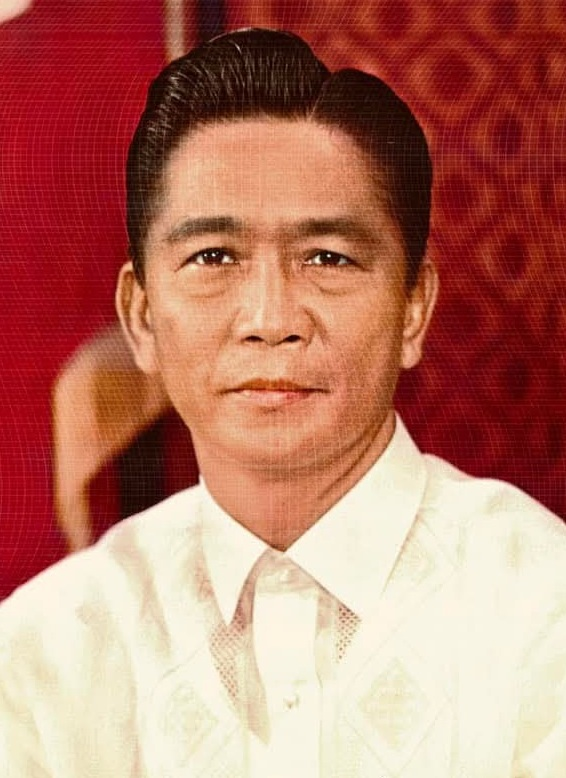
Ferdinand E.
Marcos Sr.

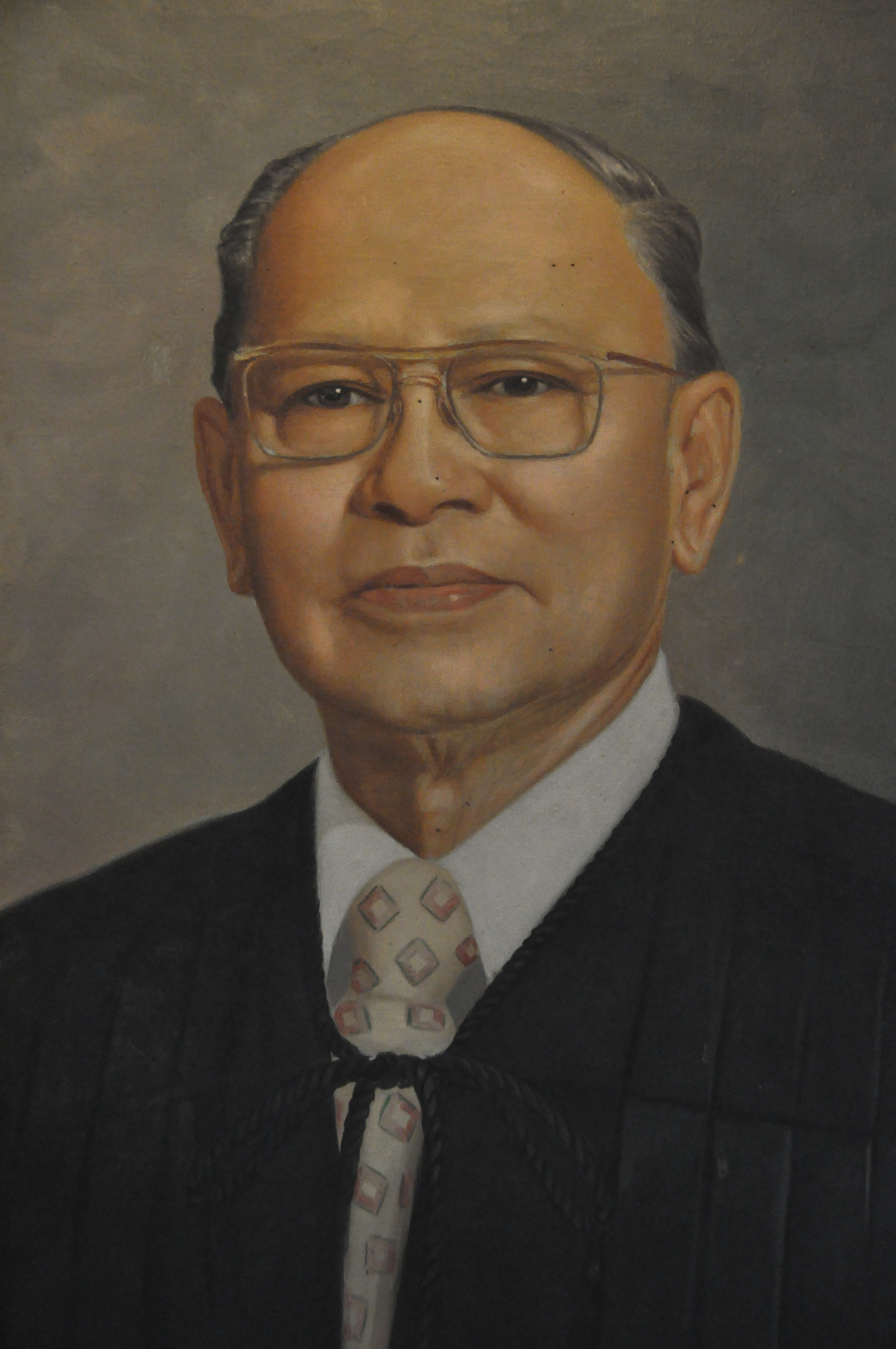
Querube C.
Makalintal

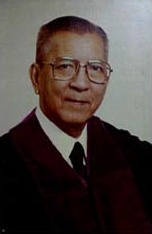
Enrique M.
Fernando

- President: Ferdinand Marcos (KBL)
- Prime Minister: Ferdinand Marcos (KBL)
- House Speaker: Querube Makalintal
- Chief Justice:
  - Fred Ruiz Castro (until July 2)
  - Enrique Fernando (starting July 2)

== Events ==
=== March ===
- March 29 – A fire in a discothèque and massage parlor in Manila kills 15 persons.

=== April ===
- April 10 – Presidential Decree No. 1616, an act to create an Intramuros Administration for the purpose of restoring and developing Intramuros is enacted.
- April 18 – A typhoon kills at least 12 persons, left hundreds homeless, and caused property damage estimated at $3.5 million.

=== May ===
- May 7 – Sangguniang Pampook elections are held for the Regional Legislative Assembly of the former Autonomous Regions in the Philippines which are the Region IX and Region XII.

=== October ===
- October 31 – Project Gintong Alay, a national sports program commences.

=== December ===
- December 20 – A bus plunges into a river in Isabela, killing at least 50 persons.

== Holidays ==
On February 15, President Marcos issued Letter of Instruction No. 814, providing a list of holidays for that year, and guidelines for observation of such.

Legal public holidays

- January 1 – New Year's Day
- April 9 – Bataan Day
- April 12 – Maundy Thursday
- April 13 – Good Friday
- May 1 – Labor Day
- June 12 – Independence Day
- July 4 – Fil-Am Day
- August 26 – National Heroes Day
- November 30 – Bonifacio Day
- December 25 – Christmas Day
- December 30 – Rizal Day

Nationwide special holidays

- April 14 – Holy Saturday (additional holiday)
- September 11 – Barangay Day
- September 21 – Thanksgiving Day
- November 1 – All Saints Day
- November 2 and 3 – additional holidays
- December 31 – in lieu of Rizal Day since the latter fell on Sunday

== Entertainment and culture ==
- July 30 – Eat Bulaga!, the longest running noon-time variety show in the Philippines, premiered on RPN. It was also aired on ABS-CBN from 1989 to 1995, GMA Network from 1995 to 2023 and the TV5 since 2023.
- November 12 – Melanie Marquez is crowned as Miss International 1979 in the pageant night which was held in Mielparque, Tokyo, Japan.

== Births ==
- January 18 – Mark Anthony Fernandez, actor
- January 21 – Rex Gatchalian, politician
- January 29 – Marvin Agustin, actor, chef, and entrepreneur
- January 30 – Richard "Muji" Rivera, A heavy weight bodybuilder of the 90's
- February 23 – Wacky Roxas, actor
- March 1 – Lee Vann Corteza, pool player
- March 4 – Mariz Umali, broadcast journalist
- March 17 – Sarji Ruiz, actor
- April 10 – Ryan Agoncillo, film and television actor, model and photographer
- April 14 – King, singer
- April 26 – Neil Ryan Sese, actor
- May 9 – Ara Mina, Actress and singer
- May 11 – Eric Yap, politician
- June 9:
  - Steven Alonzo, actor, musician and Voice Unlimited member
  - Jefferson Utanes, voice actor and announcer (d. 2025)
- June 14 – Ren-Ren Ritualo, basketball player and coach
- July 20 – Claudine Barretto, actress
- August 16 – Sarah Balabagan, prisoner and singer
- August 22 – Angelu De Leon actress
- September 22 – Jericho Rosales, actor and singer
- September 23 – Maureen Larrazabal, actress
- September 24 – Julia Clarete, actress, singer, and host
- September 28 – Amanda Griffin, actress, TV host and commercial model
- October 2 – Mark Vernal, actor
- October 4 – Zen Hernandez, broadcast journalist
- November 19 – Mark Caguioa, basketball player
- December 10 – Lui Villaruz, actor and TV director
- December 12 – Carlos Agassi, actor and model
- December 17 – Denise Joaquin, actress

== Births unknown ==
- Babylita Mariano, actress, model, singer and TV host (Member Testimonial of EZShop)

== Deaths ==
- June 9 – Rudy Fernandez, labor leader
- September 4 – Canuplin, Filipino stage performer and magician
