= 1981 in the Philippines =

- Decades: 1960s; 1970s; 1980s; 1990s; 2000s
- See also: List of years in the Philippines; films

1981 in the Philippines details events of note that happened in the Philippines in the year 1981.

== Incumbents ==
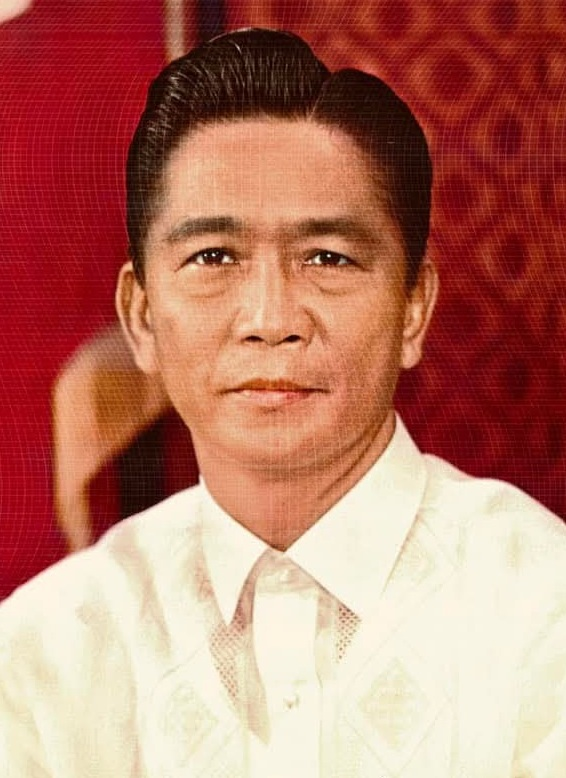
Ferdinand E.
Marcos Sr.

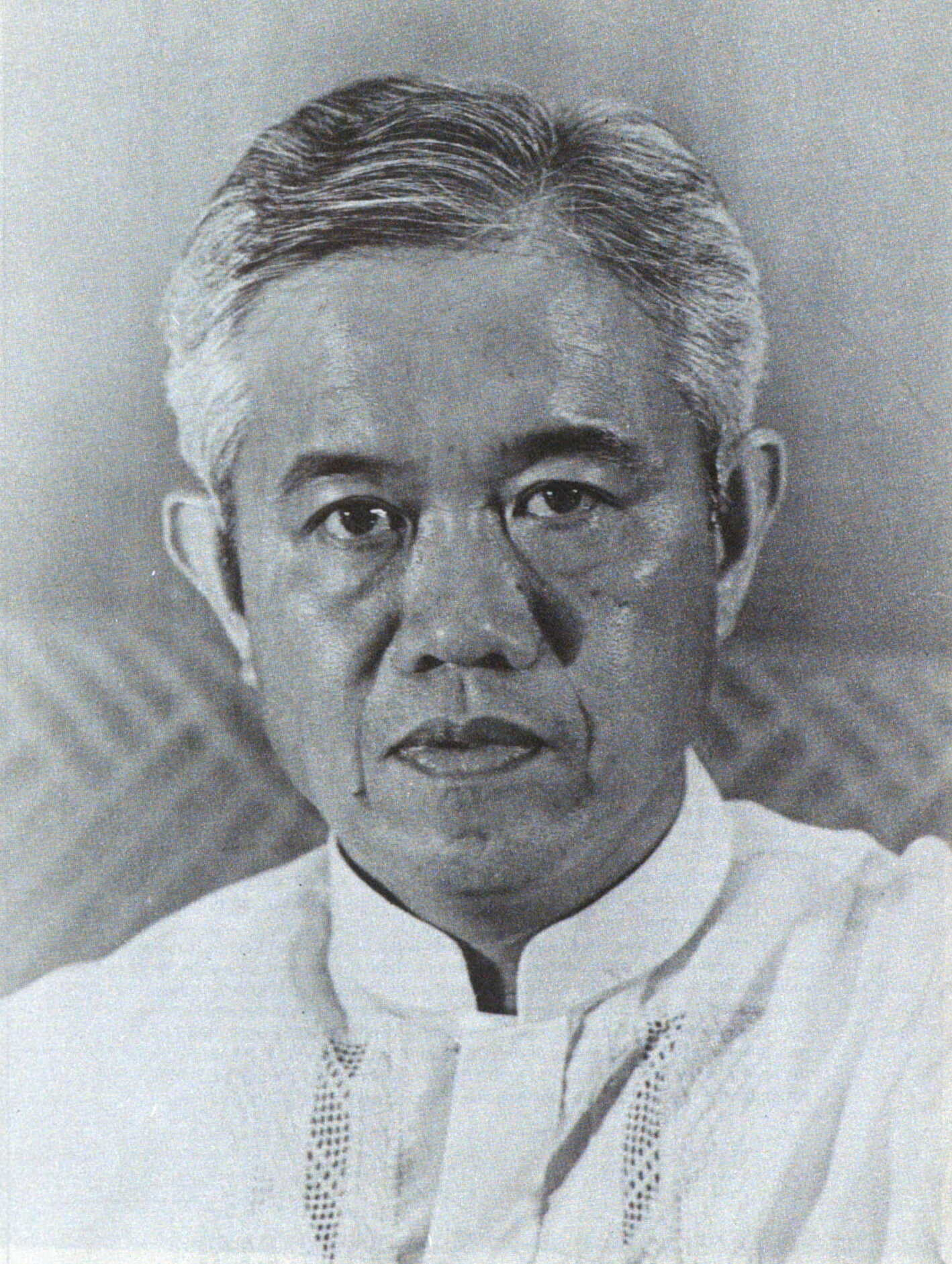
Cesar A.
Virata

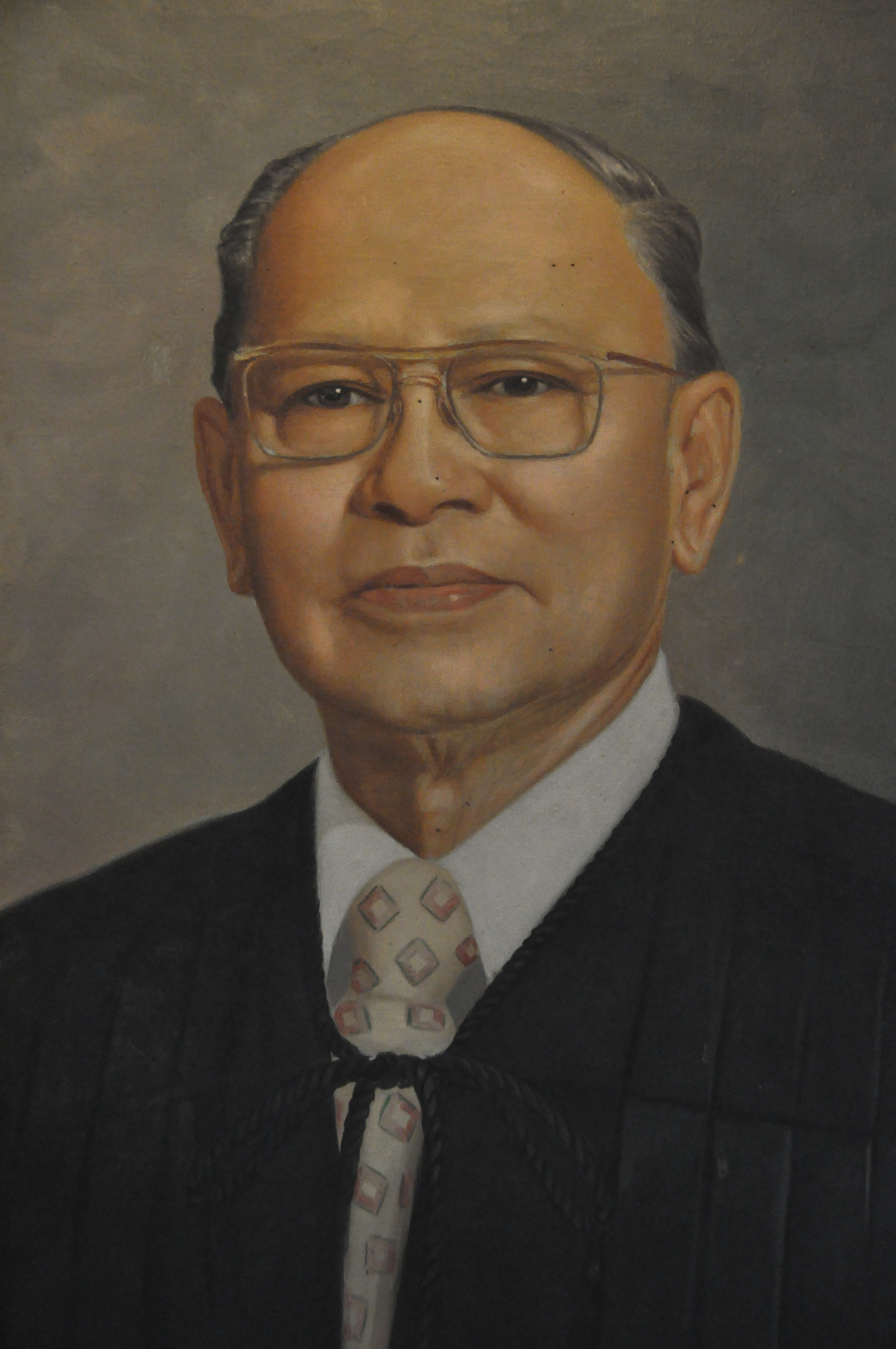
Querube C.
Makalintal

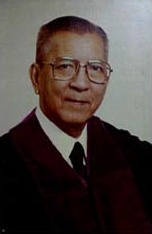
Enrique M.
Fernando

- President: Ferdinand Marcos (KBL)
- Prime Minister:
  - Ferdinand Marcos (KBL) (until June 30)
  - Cesar Virata (KBL) (starting June 30)
- House Speaker: Querube Makalintal
- Chief Justice: Enrique Fernando

== Events ==
=== January ===
- January 5 – The Film Academy of the Philippines is founded through Executive Order 640-A issued by President Ferdinand Marcos.
- January 17 – Martial Law is lifted by President Marcos.
- Until late January – Constant heavy rains that began on December 19, 1980, batter eastern Mindanao, resulting to massive flooding in several areas along Agusan River, particularly on January 18—the worst since 1962. President Marcos declares Agusan del Norte, Agusan del Sur, Davao del Sur, Misamis Oriental, Surigao del Norte, and Surigao del Sur, disaster areas. The total damage is placed at $13 million. By January 29, there are 204 people reported dead.

=== February ===
- February 12 – Moslem rebels attack a Philippine Army unit in Pata Island, Sulu, killing 119–124 troops in the worst outbreak of fighting since the 1974 rebel offensive of Jolo.
- February 17–22 – First papal visit of Pope John Paul II in the country; during the visit, he beatified Lorenzo Ruiz.
- February 26 – A U.S. Air Force C-130 plane crashes into the South China Sea, near Subic Bay Naval Base, killing 23 of 24 American, Philippine, Australian, and New Zealand military personnel aboard.

=== April ===
- April 7 – National and local plebiscites are held. The majority of the Filipino people voted yes to the terms and constitutional amendments. All were in favor of the creation of the new municipalities in Bohol, South Cotabato and Zamboanga del Norte provinces.

=== June ===
- June 16 – Presidential election and referendum are held. Incumbent president Marcos of the Kilusang Bagong Lipunan is re-elected, defeating twelve other candidates in a landslide victory by obtaining 88.02% of valid votes; while 81.09% agree having a barangay election immediately thereafter. Most opposition parties boycott the elections as a sign of protest over the 1978 elections for an interim Batasang Pambansa (National Assembly) which they condemned as fraudulent.

=== July ===
- July 1 – Tropical Storm Kelly lashes through the islands, killing 120 people in floods and mud slides.

=== August ===
- August 31 – Pirates raid trading vessel Nuria 767, with Jolo, Sulu–Labuan, Malaysia route, in the Sulu Sea off Cagayan de Tawi-Tawi, loot it and shoot to death 10–11 people; 48 passengers leap into the sea to escape, some of them are later rescued while 25 are drowned.

=== September ===
- September 20 – The Philippine Navy destroyer 'Datu Kalantlaw' runs aground, killing at least 40 sailors.

=== November ===
- November 17 – Manila Film Center collapses, killing 169 workers.
- November 24 – Typhoon Irma batters the northern part of the island of Luzon, killing more than 50 people.

=== December ===
- December 26 – Typhoon Lee sweeps across the Philippines, killing 50 people and leaving nearly 200,000 homeless.

== Holidays ==
Letter of Instruction No. 1087, issued by President Marcos in 1980 that provided revised guidelines for observation of holidays, remained in effect.

Compared to the previously-repealed Letter of Instruction No. 814 issued in 1979, the letter strictly mandated that when a legal holiday fell on a Sunday, only a proclamation was required to declare the following Monday a special public holiday. Moreover, the observance of Bataan Day, from April 9, was moved to May 6, to be known collectively as Araw ng Kagitingan that commemorating as well Corregidor and Besang Pass, to be effective that year.

Legal public holidays

- January 1 – New Year's Day
- April 16 – Maundy Thursday
- April 17 – Good Friday
- May 1 – Labor Day
- May 6 – Araw ng Kagitingan (Bataan, Corregidor and Besang Pass Day)
- June 12 – Independence Day
- July 4 – Filipino-American Friendship Day
- August 30 – National Heroes Day
- November 30 – Bonifacio Day
- December 25 – Christmas Day
- December 30 – Rizal Day

Nationwide special holidays

- April 6 – additional holiday in line with the April 7 nationwide plebiscite
- June 15 – additional holiday in line with the June 16 presidential election
- June 30 – additional holiday; presidential inauguration
- September 11 – Barangay Day
- September 21 – Thanksgiving Day
- November 2 – in line with the All Saints Day as November 1 fell on a Sunday
- December 31 – Last Day of the Year

== Sports ==
- December 6–15 – Philippines hosts the 11th Southeast Asian Games for the first time in Manila. The country ranks third with an overall total of 187 medals.

== Births ==
- January 5 – Kyla, actress, singer, host
- January 19:
  - Paolo Bugia, basketball player
  - Kerby Raymundo, basketball player
- February 1 – Jay-R, actor, singer, host
- February 26 – Assunta De Rossi, actress, model
- February 28 – Jhezarie Javier, actress
- March 4 – Carol Banawa, actress, singer, host
- March 7 – Rica Peralejo, actress
- March 22:
  - Karylle, actress, host
  - Mark Andaya, actor and basketball player
- April 21:
  - Luis Manzano, actor, host
  - Kathleen Hermosa, actress
  - Cindy Kurleto, Austrian model and actress
- May 5 – Paul Artadi, basketball player
- May 12 – Dennis Trillo, actor
- June 10 – Arwind Santos, basketball player
- June 15 – James Blanco, actor, model
- June 20 – Maricar Reyes, Filipina actress, endorsement
- June 23 – Mikey Bustos, singer, comedian, and YouTube content creator
- July 3 – Empoy Marquez, singer, actor, model, endorsement, comedian
- July 26 - Chi Atienza, politician and Vice Mayor of Manila
- July 31 – M.C. Caceres, basketball player
- August 5 – Tanya Garcia, actress
- August 26 - Marcus Madrigal, actor
- August 30 – Antoinette Taus, actress, singer, host, model
- September 14 – Patrick Garcia, actor
- September 19 - Jeff Napa, basketball coach
- October 15 – Ronald Tubid, basketball player
- October 16 – Marc Pingris, basketball player
- October 17 – Paul Soriano, film director and producer
- October 19 – Christian Bautista, actor, singer, host
- October 20 – Isabel Oli, actress, model
- October 24 – Alfred Vargas, actor, model, politician
- October 29 – Angelika Dela Cruz, actress and politician
- November 1:
  - Mark Borboran, basketball player
  - Coco Martin, actor producer and VTR commercial voice endorsement
- November 13 – Mark Cardona, basketball player
- November 18:
  - Gian Magdangal, singer and actor
  - Dianne dela Fuente, singer and actress
- December 8 – Ranidel de Ocampo, basketball player
- December 11 – Lani Cayetano, politician

== Deaths ==
- March 22 – Gil Puyat, Filipino businessman and politician, Senator of the Philippines and Senate President (b. 1907)
- July 6 – Fort Acuña, professional basketball player and coach (b. 1948)
- July 25 – Gerardo de León, film director and actor (b. 1913)
- December 30 – Alfie Anido, actor (b. 1959)

== See also ==
- 1981 in Philippine television
