= 1985 in the Philippines =

- Decades: 1960s; 1970s; 1980s; 1990s; 2000s
- See also: List of years in the Philippines; films

1985 in the Philippines details events of note that happened in the Philippines in that year.

== Incumbents ==
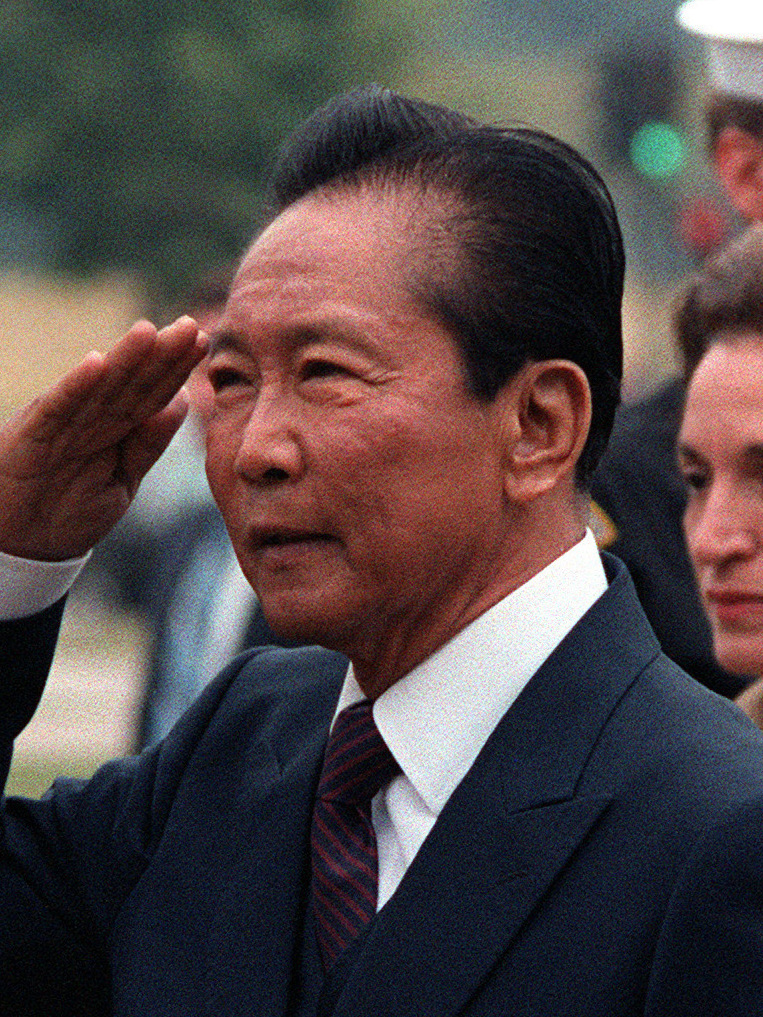
Ferdinand E.
Marcos Sr.

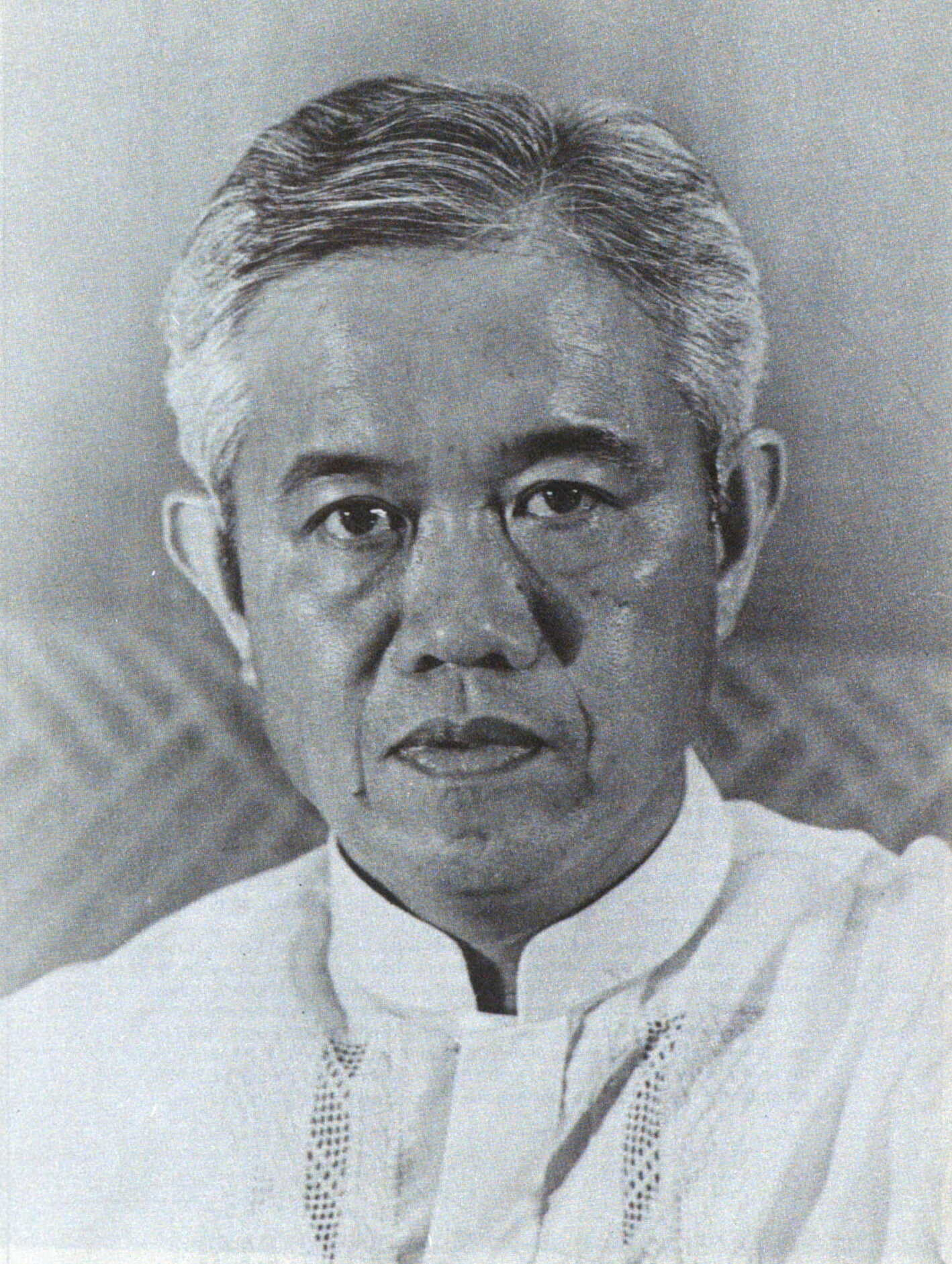
Cesar A.
Virata

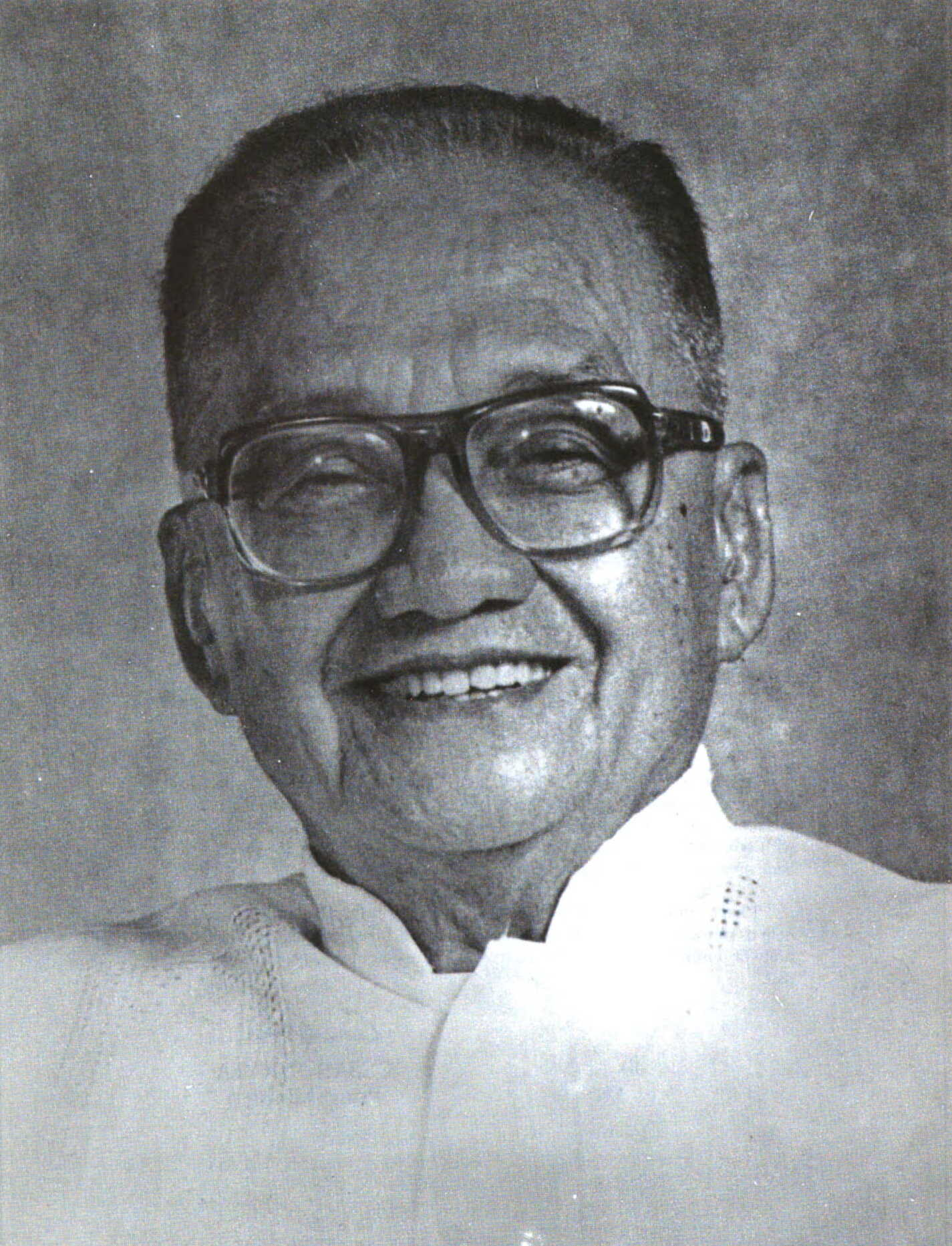
Nicanor E.
Yñiguez

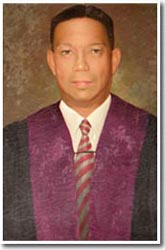
Ramon C.
Aquino

- President: Ferdinand Marcos (KBL)
- Prime Minister: Cesar Virata (KBL)
- House Speaker: Nicanor Yñiguez
- Chief Justice:
  - Enrique Fernando (until July 24)
  - Felix Makasiar (July 24 – November 20)
  - Ramon Aquino (starting November 20)

== Events ==
=== February ===
- February 13 – An arson attack on the Regent of Manila, a resort hotel in Pasay, occurs, burning it for four days and killing at least 27 people including more than ten foreigners. Between October 1984 and this month, 65, mostly foreign tourists, die in eight hotel fires in Baguio and Metro Manila; the incident being the sixth.

=== April ===
- April 22 – A fire in a theater complex inside a commercial building in Tabaco, Albay kills 44 people.

=== June ===
- June 12 – The Central Bank issues the New Design Series, starting with a new 5-peso banknote with the face of Emilio Aguinaldo.

=== August ===
- August 13 – Fifty-six assemblymen of the Regular Batasang Pambansa sign a resolution calling for the impeachment of President Ferdinand Marcos for graft and corruption, culpable violation of the Constitution, gross violation of his oath of office and other high crimes.

=== September ===
- September 20 – In Escalante, Negros Occidental, pro-government paramilitary forces gun down civilians engaged in a protest-rally in commemoration of the 13th anniversary of the declaration of Martial Law. At least 20 die and 30 more are injured.

=== October ===
- October 18 – Typhoon Saling made landfall in the Philippines. The typhoon leaves 101 dead and $68 million in damage (1985 dollars).

=== November ===
- November 2 – The military reports that at least 21 people had been killed in anti-communist clashes in southern Mindanao.
- November 3 – President Marcos announces in a television interview he would set snap elections.

=== December ===
- December 2 – The Sandiganbayan acquits all the accused including General Fabian Ver in the Assassination of Benigno Aquino Jr.
- December 9 – The Philippine Daily Inquirer is founded by Eugenia Apostol, Max Soliven and Betty Go-Belmonte, as the broadsheet releases its first issue.

== Holidays ==
Letter of Instruction No. 1087, issued by President Marcos in 1980 that provided revised guidelines for observation of holidays, remained in effect. The letter strictly mandated that when a legal holiday fell on a Sunday, only a proclamation was required to declare the following Monday a special public holiday.

The Barangay and Thanksgiving (September 11 and 21, respectively) days were observed for the last time. The issuance declaring both as national holidays was eventually repealed by a 1986 order authorized by President Corazon Aquino.

Legal public holidays

- January 1 – New Year's Day
- April 5 – Maundy Thursday
- April 6 – Good Friday
- May 1 – Labor Day
- May 6 – Araw ng Kagitingan (Bataan, Corregidor and Besang Pass Day)
- June 12 – Independence Day
- July 4 – Filipino-American Friendship Day
- August 25 – National Heroes Day
- November 30 – Bonifacio Day
- December 25 – Christmas Day
- December 30 – Rizal Day

Nationwide special holidays

- September 11 – Barangay Day
- September 21 – Thanksgiving Day
- November 1 – All Saints Day
- December 31 – Last Day of the Year

== Business and economy ==
- November 8 – SM City North EDSA is opened as the first SM Supermall in the Philippines.

== Births ==
- January 14 – Jason Abalos, television actor
- January 16 – Stefano Mori, actor and musician
- January 20 – Roxanne Barcelo, Filipino-American singer and actress
- January 31 – Ronnie Liang, singer
- February 9 – Gabe Norwood, basketball player
- February 11 – Chris Lutz, basketball player
- February 14 – Heart Evangelista, Chinese-Filipino singer, actress and TV show host
- February 17 – Anne Curtis, actress, singer, model and TV show host
- February 24 – Aicelle Santos, singer-songwriter
- March 8 – Michael Burtscher, basketball player
- March 18 – Bianca King, Filipina-German model and actress
- April 7 – KC Concepcion, singer and actress; currently the Philippines Goodwill Ambassador against hunger of the UN's World Food Programme
- April 14 – Mac Baracael, basketball player
- April 15 – Diana Zubiri, actress
- April 16 – JC Tiuseco, Chinese Filipino actor, basketball player, TV show host and model
- April 23 – Angel Locsin, actress and commercial model
- May 8 – Jayvee Uy, politician
- June 1 – L.A. Lopez, singer and preacher
- June 6 – Victor Basa, actor
- June 16 – Francis Allera, basketball player
- June 20 – Camille Prats, actress
- June 23 – Laarni Lozada, singer
- June 30 – Sander Severino, chess player (d. 2026)
- July 7 – Pong Escobal, basketball
- July 15 – Chris Tiu, professional basketball player, TV show host and commercial model
- July 20 – Solenn Heussaff, actress, model, and host
- August 15 – Cogie Domingo, actor
- September 1 – Camile Velasco, Filipino American singer-songwriter
- September 3 – Carlo Aquino, actor and musician
- September 5 – John Medina, actor
- September 7 – Neri Naig, actress
- September 8 – Renz Fernandez, actor
- September 9 – Ketchup Eusebio, actor
- September 27 – Alex Castro, actor and model
- October 7 – Jason Ballesteros, basketball player
- October 8:
  - Bruno Mars, Filipino American singer-songwriter and record producer
  - Rox Santos, songwriter
- October 13 – Jimbo Aquino, basketball player
- October 19 – RR Enriquez, model, television host and actress
- November 5 – Patricia Fernandez, actress
- November 17 – Bea Saw, actress
- November 23 – Elmer Espiritu, basketball player
- December 5 – Dionne Monsanto, actress
- December 11 – Lovely Abella, dancer and comedian

== Deaths ==
- January 2 – Gabriel "Flash" Elorde, Filipino boxer (b. 1935)
- January 14 – Teodoro Agoncillo, Filipino historian and author (b. 1912)
- March 7 – Victorio C. Edades, Filipino painter (b. 1895)
- May 6 – Julie Vega, Filipina child actress and singer (b. 1968)
- May 31 – Pepsi Paloma, teenage star (b. 1966)
- August 11 – Manuel Conde, actor, director, and producer (b. 1915)
- December 15 – Carlos P. Romulo, Filipino diplomat, politician, soldier, journalist, and author (b. 1898)
