= 1984 in the Philippines =

- Decades: 1960s; 1970s; 1980s; 1990s; 2000s
- See also: List of years in the Philippines; films

1984 in the Philippines details events of note that happened in the Philippines in the year 1984.

== Incumbents ==
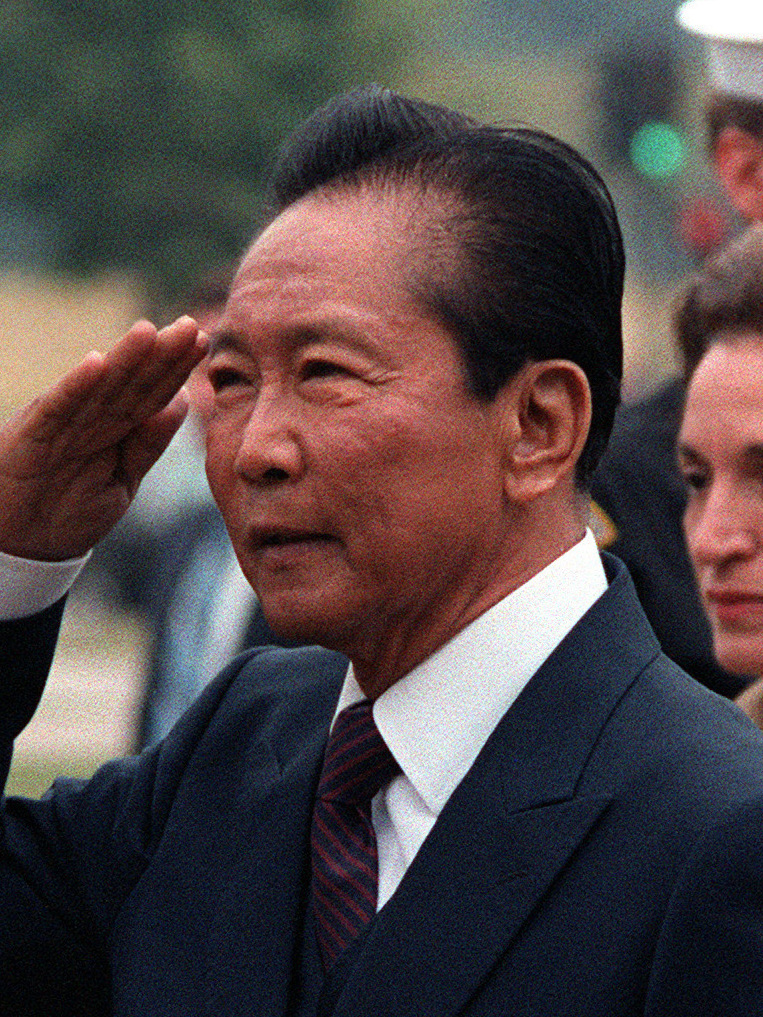
Ferdinand E.
Marcos Sr.

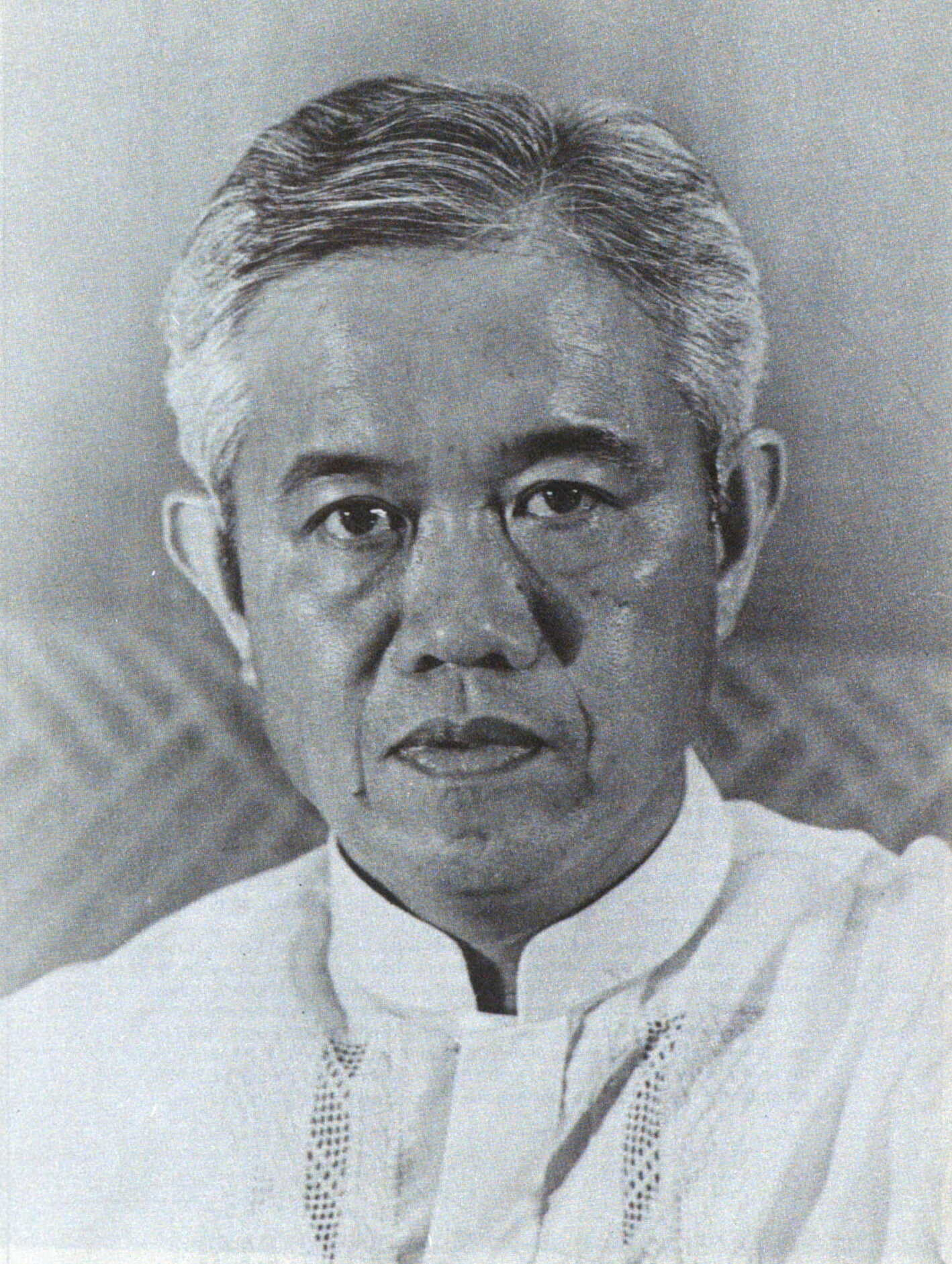
Cesar A.
Virata

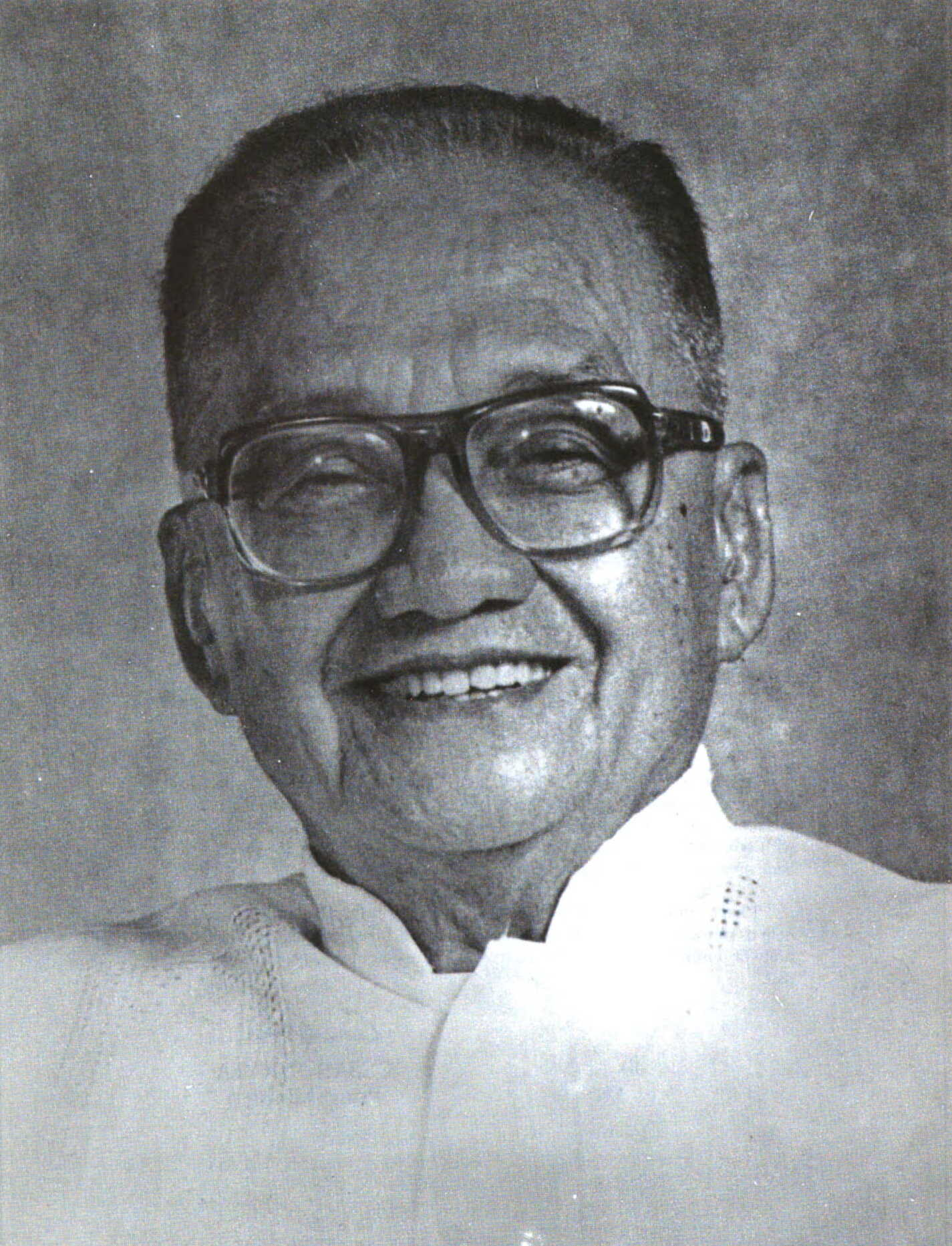
Nicanor E.
Yñiguez

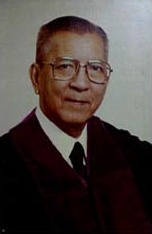
Enrique M.
Fernando

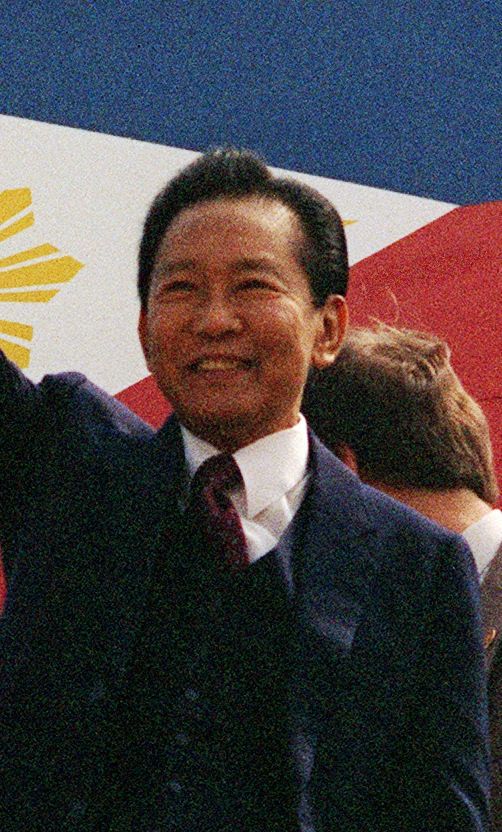
President Ferdinand Marcos

- President: Ferdinand Marcos (KBL)
- Prime Minister: Cesar Virata (KBL)
- House Speaker: Nicanor Yñiguez
- Chief Justice: Enrique Fernando

== Events ==
=== January ===
- January 27 – National and local plebiscites are held for the approval of the proposed constitutional amendments and local bills made by the Interim Batasang Pambansa.
- January 31 – Huge rally against the Presidency and dishonest governance of Ferdinand Marcos held by supporters of Ninoy Aquino attended by around 25,000 people which resulted in a crackdown by Constabulary forces.

=== May ===
- May 14 – Parliamentary elections are held. The opposition runs for the Regular Batasang Pambansa under the United Nationalist Democratic Organization (UNIDO) and the Partido Demokratikong Pilipino–Lakas ng Bayan (PDP–Laban) against the ruling Kilusang Bagong Lipunan (KBL) of Ferdinand Marcos. The KBL wins a majority with 114 seats, but markedly down from 163 seats last election.

=== August ===
- August 11 – Three armed pirates attack skippered passenger boat Tampil, with a Semporna, Malaysia–Pulau Sitangkai route, off Pulau Bulu-Bulu in Sitangkai, Tawi-Tawi, kill 33 of 51 people aboard, and kidnap three.

=== September ===
- September 1 – Typhoon Nitang strikes the Philippines. It kills 1,492 people and 1,856 more are injured. Roughly 1.6 million people are affected in the country. A total of 108,219 homes are destroyed and 142,653 more are damaged. However, President Ferdinand Marcos declared a state of calamity only after Nitang's onslaught.

=== October ===
- October 23 – A fire destroys Pines Hotel, a hillside hotel in Baguio; killing 17–22 people, nine of them members of the American Legion tour group which has been commemorating the 1944 return of Gen. Douglas MacArthur to the country.

=== November ===
- November 1 and 9 – Two separate hotel fires occur in Manila. The first breaks out at the Ambassador Hotel, a tourist hotel in Ermita, causing deaths of ten or eleven people. Eight days later, another engulfs a part of the Las Palmas Hotel, killing at least six, three of them foreigners.

=== December ===
- December 1 – Manila LRT Line 1 is opened.

== Holidays ==
Letter of Instruction No. 1087, issued by President Marcos in 1980 that provided revised guidelines for observation of holidays, remained in effect. The letter strictly mandated that when a legal holiday fell on a Sunday, only a proclamation was required to declare the following Monday a special public holiday.

A day before the Filipino-American Friendship Day on July 4, Marcos issued Proclamation No. 2364 declaring that day as a regular working and school day, citing economic problems; the first time in the post-colonial period.

Legal public holidays

- January 1 – New Year's Day
- April 19 – Maundy Thursday
- April 20 – Good Friday
- May 1 – Labor Day
- May 6 – Araw ng Kagitingan (Bataan, Corregidor and Besang Pass Day)
- June 12 – Independence Day
- August 26 – National Heroes Day
- November 30 – Bonifacio Day
- December 25 – Christmas Day
- December 30 – Rizal Day

Nationwide special holidays

- September 11 – Barangay Day
- September 21 – Thanksgiving Day
- November 1 – All Saints Day
- December 31 – Last Day of the Year

== Entertainment and culture ==
- July 9 – Maria Desiree Verdadero is proclaimed 3rd runner-up in the Miss Universe 1984 pageant night was held in the James L Knight Center, Miami Beach, Florida, United States.

== Sports ==
- July 28–August 2 – The Philippines participates in the 1984 Summer Olympics in Los Angeles, United States.

== Births ==
- January 6 – Jared Dillinger, basketball player
- January 12 – Oyo Boy Sotto, actor and model
- January 19:
  - Kelvin dela Peña, basketball player
  - Xiao Chua, historian, academic and television host
- January 20 – Toni Gonzaga, singer, television host and actress
- January 21:
  - Richard Gutierrez, actor and commercial model
  - Raymond Gutierrez, actor and television host
- January 24 – Jasmin "DJ Jasmin" Basar, disc jockey, voice actress, and model (d. 2019)
- February 11 – Jeff Chan, basketball player
- February 14 – John Prats, actor, comedian, and dancer
- March 6 – Sol Mercado, basketball player
- March 14 – Paolo Contis, actor
- March 16 – Michael Roy Jornales, actor, model, martial artist, fight, director, and singer
- March 21 – Via Antonio, actress
- March 23 – Ryan Araña, basketball player
- March 28 – Joseph Bitangcol, actor,.TV Host
- April 3 – Antoinette Jadaone, film director
- April 22 – Raymond "Emong" Quodala Vallarta, Philanthropist
- May 7 – Vandolph Quizon, actor, model
- May 18 – Aleck Bovick, actress, model, and singer
- May 19 – Ken Bono, basketball player
- May 23 – Sam Milby, Filipino-American actor, commercial model, and recording artist
- May 25 – Junjun Cabatu, basketball player
- May 29 - Chubi del Rosario, Actor, Host and Singer
- June 4 – Gretchen Fullido, anchor and model
- June 29 – Paula Peralejo, actress and model
- July 9 – LA Tenorio, basketball player
- July 16 – Ginger Conejero, journalist and television personality
- July 19 – Alessandra De Rossi, actress
- July 24 – Bubbles Paraiso, actress, model
  - Boy 2 Quizon, comedian and actor
- July 27 – Jaymee Joaquin
- August 10 – Mariel Rodriguez, commercial model, television host and actress
- August 12 – Marian Rivera, commercial model and actress
- August 18 – Sam Y.G., radio and television personality
- August 23 – Eric Tai, actor, host, and rugby player
- August 29 – Rejoice Rivera, actress and member of the Baywalk Bodies (d. 2010)
- September 14 – Tyron Perez, actor, model (d. 2011)
- September 16 - Zara Lopez, actress, live seller, vlogger, businesswoman, mother, and wife (d. 2026)
- September 17 - Mark Shandii Bacolod, Filipino director, producer and talent manager (d. 2022)
- September 22 – Marcelito Pomoy, singer
- September 27 – Macky Escalona, former basketball player
- October 7 – Anna Larrucea, actress
- October 24 - Lougee Basabas, Filipino singer and songwriter
- November 13 – Dimples Romana, actress and television host
- November 16 – Janelle Jamer actress model singer
- November 19 – Janus del Prado, actor
- November 20 – Daisy Lopez, actress and vlogger
- November 23 – Gianna Lynn, actress and model
- November 28 – Joross Gamboa, actor
- November 29 – Sitti Navarro, Filipina bossa nova singer
- December 8 – Hero Angeles, actor
- December 10 – Krista Ranillo, Filipina actress
- December 30 – Rico Barrera
- December 31 – Marvin Cruz, basketball player

== Deaths ==
- February 10 – Claudia Zobel, Filipino actress (b. 1964)
- February 18 – Alejo Santos, Filipino soldier and World War II hero (b. 1911)
- March 26 – Sergio Osmeña Jr., Filipino politician, former mayor of Cebu City (b. 1916)
- November 14 – Cesar Climaco, Filipino politician (b. 1916)
