= 1983 in the Philippines =

- Decades: 1960s; 1970s; 1980s; 1990s; 2000s
- See also: List of years in the Philippines; films

1983 in the Philippines details events of note that happened in the Philippines in that year.

== Incumbents ==
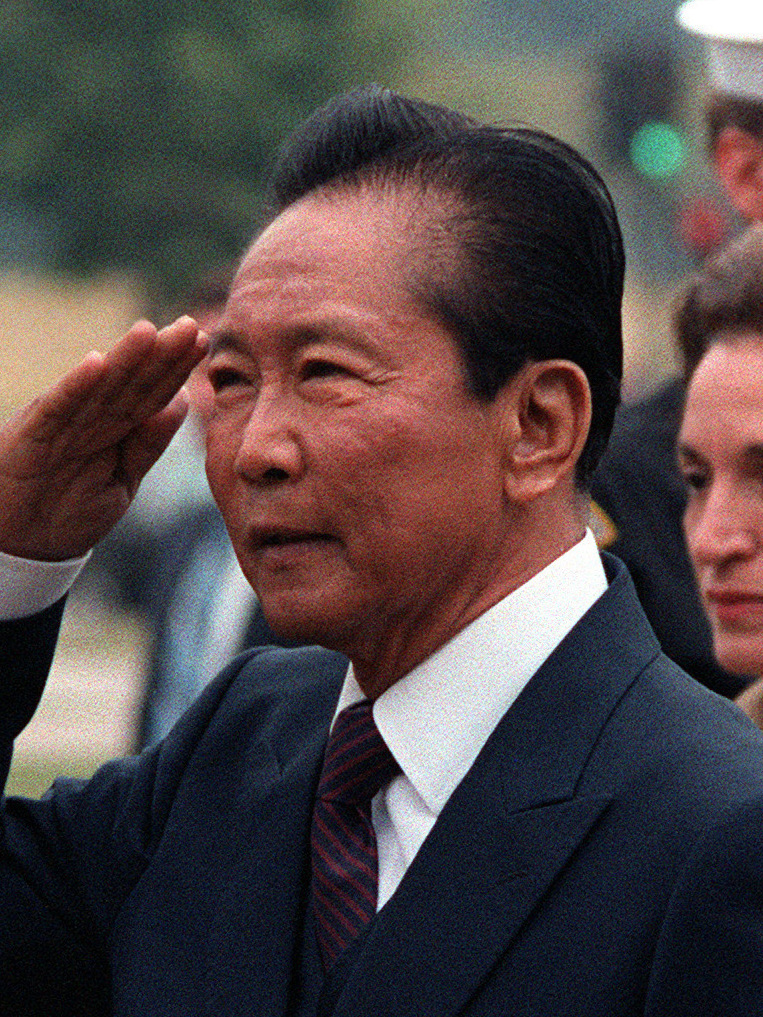
Ferdinand E.
Marcos Sr.

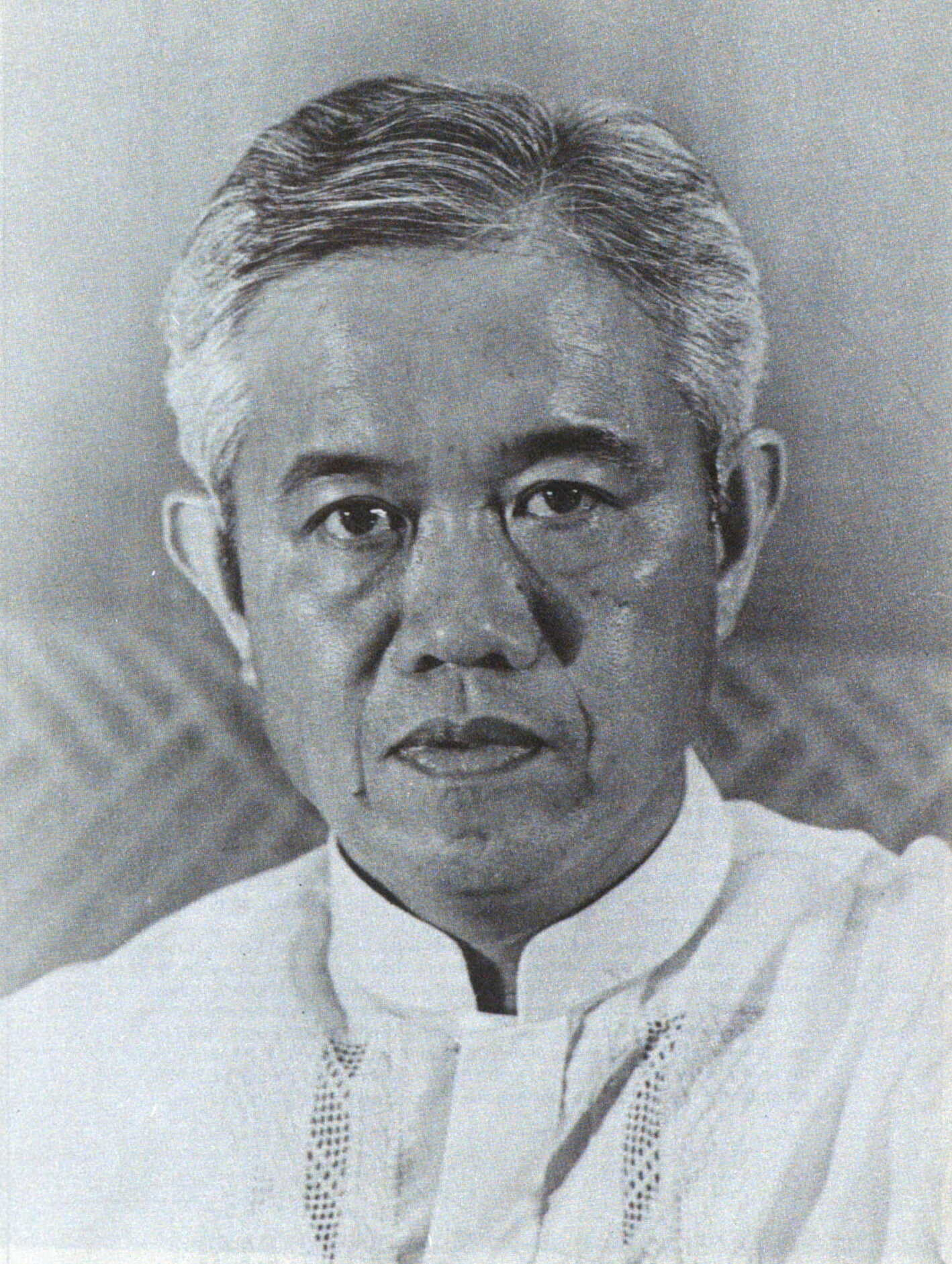
Cesar A.
Virata

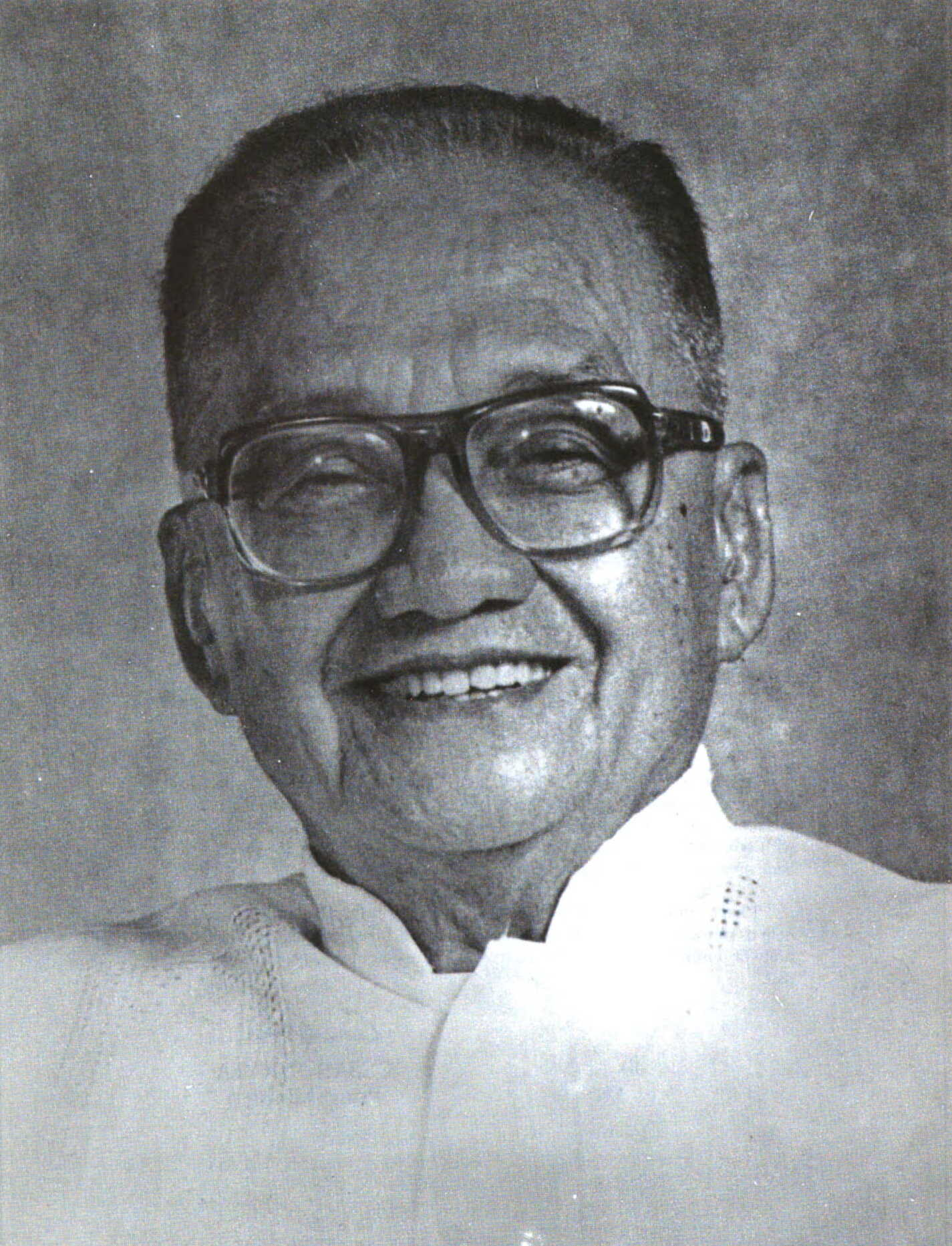
Nicanor E.
Yñiguez

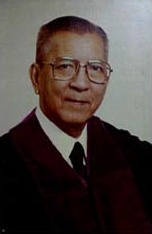
Enrique M.
Fernando

- President: Ferdinand Marcos (KBL)
- Prime Minister: Cesar Virata (KBL)
- House Speaker: Nicanor Yñiguez
- Chief Justice:
  - Querube C. Makalintal (until June 30)
  - Enrique Fernando (starting June 30)

== Events ==
=== February ===
- February 6 – Fifteen workers die in a mine explosion in Danao, Cebu caused by a cigarette.

=== July ===
- July 12–15 – Typhoon Bebeng, The monsoon spawns a tropical depression on July 12, east of the Philippines. It heads westward, strengthening to a tropical storm that night and a typhoon on the 13th. Vera makes landfall on the 14th as an 85 mph (137 km/h) typhoon in the Philippines, weakens over the islands, especially Luzon, and strengthens over the South China Sea to a 100 mph (160 km/h) typhoon. Damages amounting to a total of US$9 million in the Philippines. The typhoon leaves 45 people dead.

=== August ===
- August 17 – An earthquake measuring 6.5 on the Richter scale strikes Luzon, the Philippines' largest island, leaving at least 21 people dead.
- August 21 – Former Senator Benigno Aquino Jr. and Ronaldo Galman are shot dead at Manila International Airport tarmac after his arrival. The event is cited to be a catalyst to the People Power Revolution.

=== September ===
- September 29 – Forty-six soldiers and civilians are killed when an army patrol unit is ambushed by New People's Army guerrillas in Godod, Zamboanga del Norte; the death toll is the highest suffered by Government forces in a single attack.

=== October ===
- October 3 – More than 20,000 Filipino workers at two American military bases in Clark and Subic go on strike, demanding a wage increase.

=== November ===
- November 21 – The inter-island ferry MV Cassandra sinks during a storm off Cebu, killing at least 167 people.

== Holidays ==
Letter of Instruction No. 1087, issued by President Marcos in 1980 that provided revised guidelines for observation of holidays, remained in effect. The letter strictly mandated that when a legal holiday fell on a Sunday, only a proclamation was required to declare the following Monday a special public holiday.

Legal public holidays

- January 1 – New Year's Day
- March 31 – Maundy Thursday
- April 1 – Good Friday
- May 1 – Labor Day
- May 6 – Araw ng Kagitingan (Bataan, Corregidor and Besang Pass Day)
- June 12 – Independence Day
- July 4 – Filipino-American Friendship Day
- August 28 – National Heroes Day
- November 30 – Bonifacio Day
- December 25 – Christmas Day
- December 30 – Rizal Day

Nationwide special holidays

- September 11 – Barangay Day
- September 21 – Thanksgiving Day
- November 1 – All Saints Day
- December 31 – Last Day of the Year

== Entertainment and culture ==
- February 13 - The launching of Ang Iglesia ni Cristo the first religious program on MBS Channel 4 (now PTV-4).

=== Date unknown ===
- The religious program Ang Dating Daan starts its television broadcast on IBC 13.

== Births ==
- January 3:
  - Precious Lara Quigaman, actress, Miss International 2005 winner
  - Jopay Paguia, dancer and actress
- January 13 – Jojo Duncil, basketball player
- January 20 – Angelica Jones, actress, singer, and politician
- February 11 – Jeff Chan, basketball player
- March 2 – Jerald Napoles, actor and comedian
- March 11 – Bianca Gonzalez, host
- March 12 – Sid Lucero, actor
- March 21 – Laura James, actress and commercial model
- April 22 – Boyet Bautista, basketball player
- May 27 – Ronjay Buenafe, basketball player
- June 14 – Yousif Aljamal, basketball player
- June 24 – John Lloyd Cruz, actor
- June 28 – Maui Taylor, actress, model, singer
- July 3 – Sunshine Dizon, actress
- July 10 – Doug Kramer, basketball player
- July 12 – Marco Alcaraz, actor, commercial model, and basketball player
- July 23 – Ping Medina, actor
- July 27 – AJ Dee, Filipino actor
- July 29 – Chad Alonzo, basketball player
- August 10 – Mark Bautista, actor and singer
- September 6 – Aira Bermudez, dancer and actress
- September 9 – Kristine Hermosa, actress
- September 17 – Ice Seguerra, singer
- November 18 – JC Intal, basketball player
- November 22 – Eduard Folayang, mixed martial artist and former MMA World Champion

== Deaths ==
- June 2 – Julio Rosales, Cardinal
- August 21 – Ninoy Aquino, politician and senator
- November 30 – Juan Liwag, lawyer and politician
- December 5 – Felixberto Olalia, labor leader; founding chairperson of Kilusang Mayo Uno (b. 1903)
