= 1982 in the Philippines =

- Decades: 1960s; 1970s; 1980s; 1990s; 2000s
- See also: List of years in the Philippines; films

1982 in the Philippines details events of note that happened in the Philippines in the year 1982.

== Incumbents ==
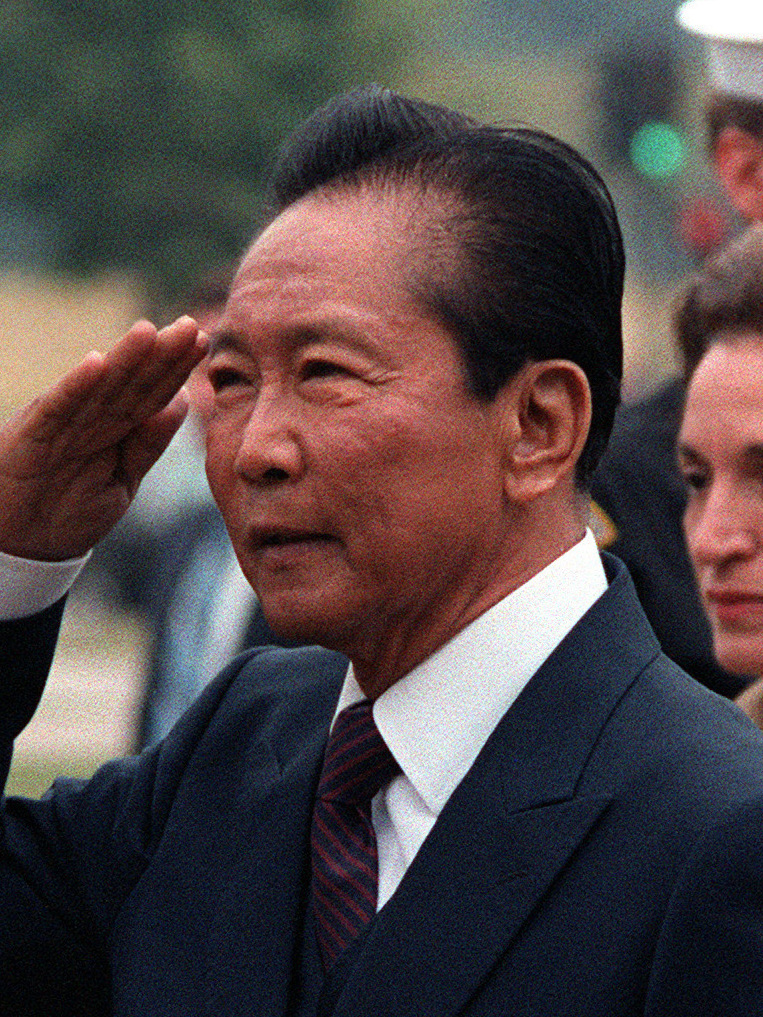
Ferdinand E.
Marcos Sr.

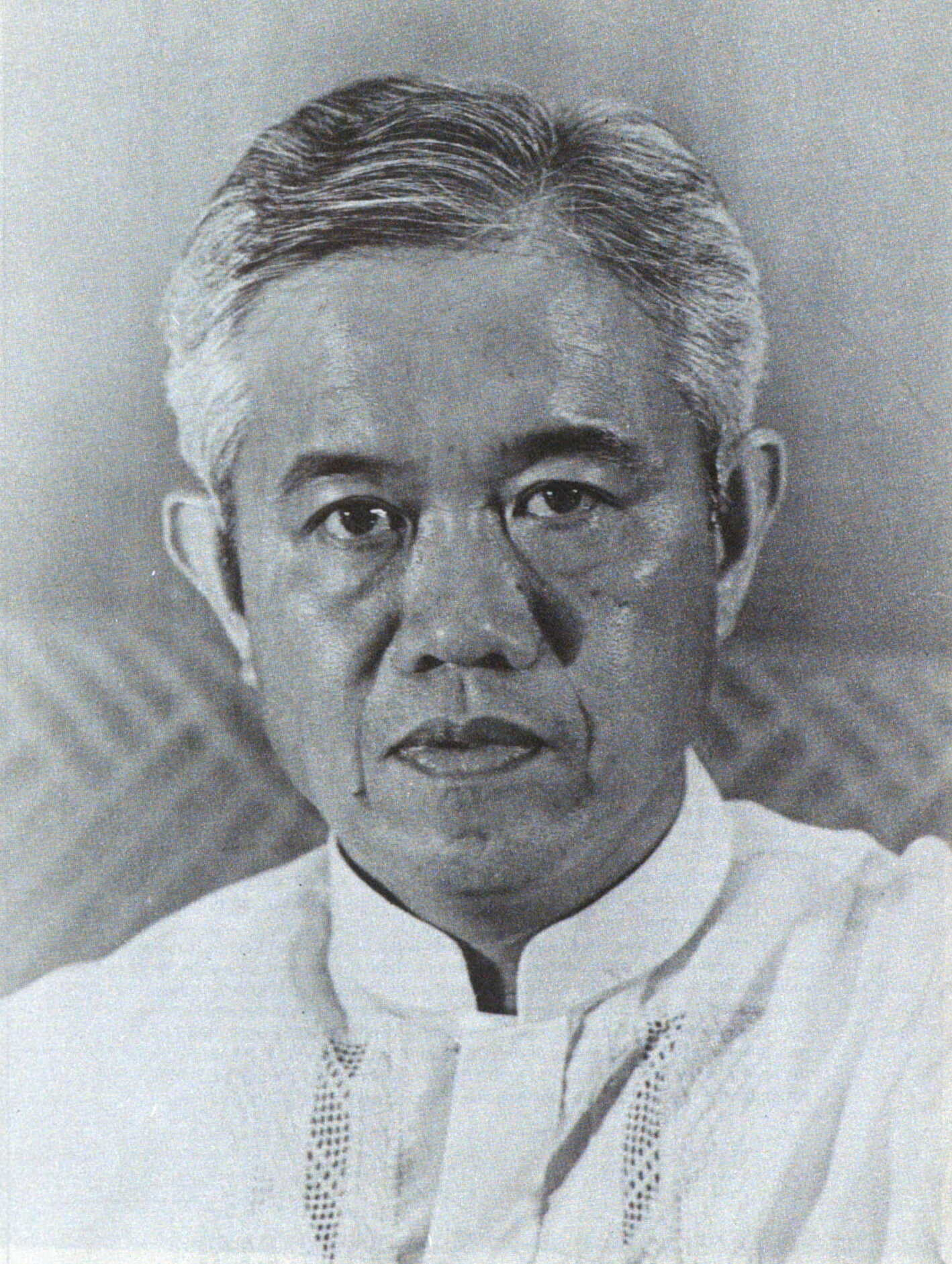
Cesar A.
Virata

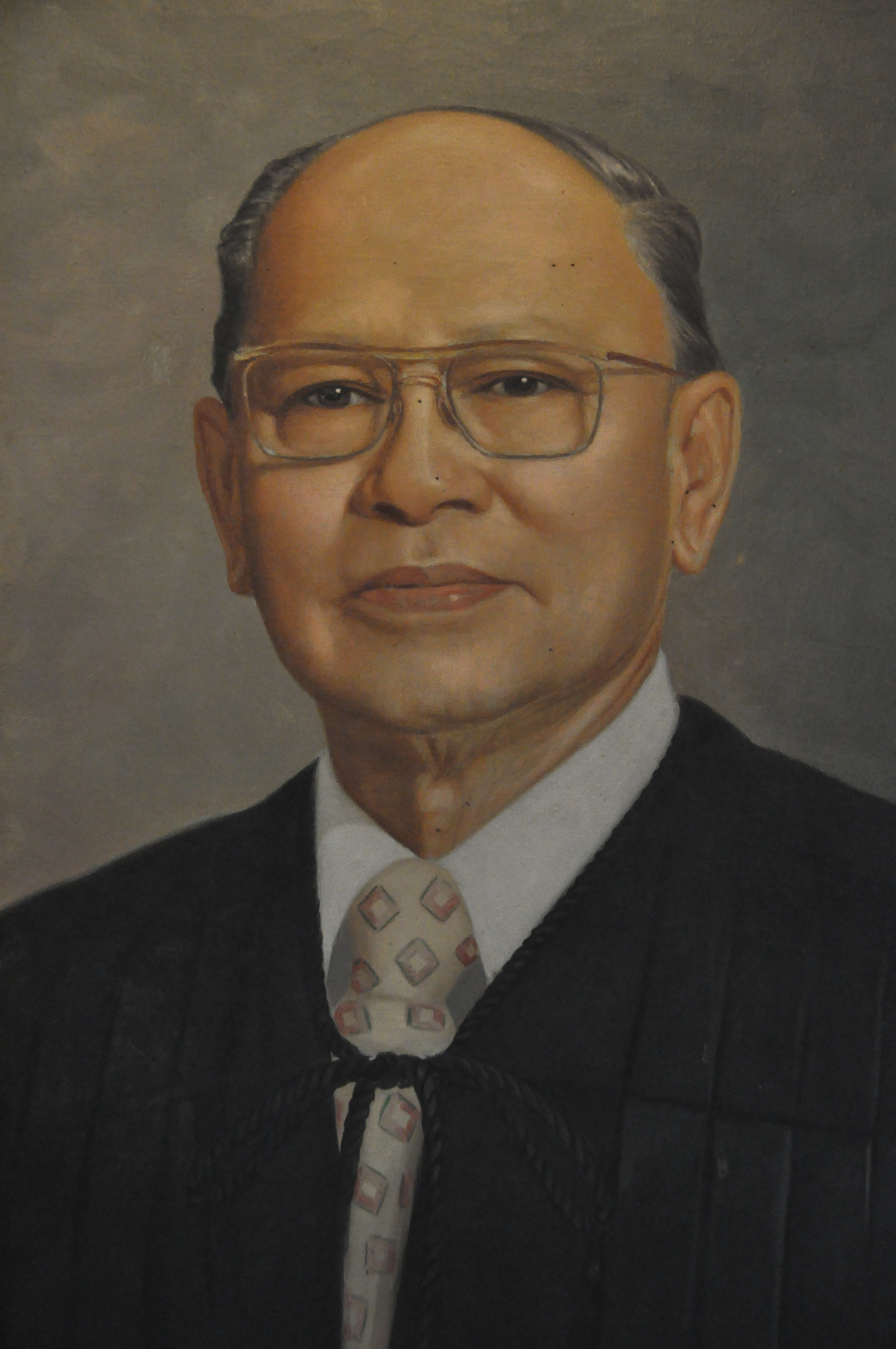
Querube C.
Makalintal

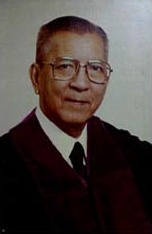
Enrique M.
Fernando

- President: Ferdinand Marcos (KBL)
- Prime Minister: Cesar Virata (KBL)
- House Speaker: Querube Makalintal
- Chief Justice: Enrique Fernando

== Events ==
=== March ===
- March 30 – At least 38 deaths resulted when Typhoon Nelson tears through the central and southern areas of the country.

=== May ===
- May 17 – Barangay elections are held for the first time in the country's 42,000 barangays for the positions of barangay captains and six councilors following the Batas Pambansa Blg. 222 or the Barangay Election Act of 1982.

=== July ===
- July 21 – Unidentified gunmen ambush a car carrying Minister of State and former Vice President Emmanuel Pelaez in New Manila, Quezon City, seriously injuring him and killing his driver.
- July 25 – The tourist ship 'Coral Island' caught fire off Manila Bay when an engine exploded on a trial run, and 21 crew members died.

=== November ===
- November 18 - Sara Jane Coronel Areza is proclaimed Top 15 in the Miss World 1982 pageant night which is held in the Royal Albert Hall, London, United Kingdom.

== Holidays ==
Letter of Instruction No. 1087, issued by President Marcos in 1980 that provided revised guidelines for observation of holidays, remained in effect. The letter strictly mandated that when a legal holiday fell on a Sunday, only a proclamation was required to declare the following Monday a special public holiday.

Legal public holidays

- January 1 – New Year's Day
- April 8 – Maundy Thursday
- April 9 – Good Friday
- May 1 – Labor Day
- May 6 – Araw ng Kagitingan (Bataan, Corregidor and Besang Pass Day)
- June 12 – Independence Day
- July 4 – Filipino-American Friendship Day
- August 29 – National Heroes Day
- November 30 – Bonifacio Day
- December 25 – Christmas Day
- December 30 – Rizal Day

Nationwide special holidays

- September 11 – Barangay Day
- September 21 – Thanksgiving Day
- November 1 – All Saints Day
- December 31 – Last Day of the Year

== Sports ==
- November 19–December 4 – The Philippines participates in the 1982 Asian Games held in New Delhi, India. It ranked 10th with 2 gold medals, 3 silver medals and 9 bronze medals with a total of 14 over-all medals.

== Births ==
- January 3 – Gabby Espinas, basketball player
- January 13 – Tekla, comedian and host
- January 24 – Enzo Pastor, racing driver (d. 2014)
- February 8 – Champ Lui Pio, Musician, Vocalist
- February 9 – Joe Devance, basketball player
- February 12 – Niño Canaleta, basketball player
- February 15 – James Yap, basketball player
- March 12:
  - Samigue Eman, basketball player
  - Yexel Sebastian, dancer, internet celebrity, toy collector
- April 3 – Marc Solis, actor
- April 8 – Aaron Aban, basketball player
- May 10 – Miko Sotto, actor (d. 2003)
- May 12 – Donnie Nietes, Filipino boxer
- May 13 – Larry Fonacier, basketball player
- May 16 – Billy Crawford, singer, dancer, songwriter, actor, comedian, and TV host
- May 17 – Kaye Abad, Filipino-American actress
- May 23 – Rochelle Pangilinan, actress
- May 28 – Desiree del Valle, actress
- June 2 – Wendy Valdez, actress
- June 5 – Baron Geisler, actor, amateur artist and poet
- June 10 – Gaby Dela Merced, racecar driver
- June 16 – Jodi Sta. Maria, actress
- June 27 – Polo Ravales, actor
- July 14 – Denok Miranda, basketball player
- July 16 – Marco Morales, actor
- July 20:
  - Magnum Membrere, former basketball player
  - Sherwin Meneses, volleyball coach
- July 23 – Zanjoe Marudo, actor
- July 29 – Camille Dela Rosa, actress
- August 4 – Wilter Palma, politician
- August 20 – Ronjay Enrile, basketball player
- August 12 – Iza Calzado, actress
- September 1 – Kris Lawrence, singer
- September 8 – John "Papa Jackson" Gemperle, radio DJ
- October 4:
  - Grace Lee, host
  - Matet de Leon, actress
- October 10 – Erik Santos, singer
- October 19 – Atom Araullo, journalist
- October 26 – Niña Dolino, actress
- November 10 – Rafael Rosell, actor
- November 29 – Paolo Ballesteros, host, model, actor
- November 30 – Bonbon Custodio, basketball player
- December 6 – Chynna Ortaleza, actress
- December 12 – Alex Cabagnot, basketball player
- December 20 - Maybelyn dela Cruz, actress and politician

== Deaths ==
- April 17 – Cornelio Balmaceda, former Secretary of Commerce and Industries (b. 1896)
- June 2 – Oscar Castelo, Secretary of National Defense (b. 1903)
- October 7 – Salvador Araneta, lawyer, educator, and businessman (b. 1902)
- December 13 – Mary Cecilia of Jesus, Discalced Carmelite nun and servant of God (b. 1908)

== See also ==
- 1982 in Philippine television
