= Julius Roden =

Filipino producer & director (born 1982)

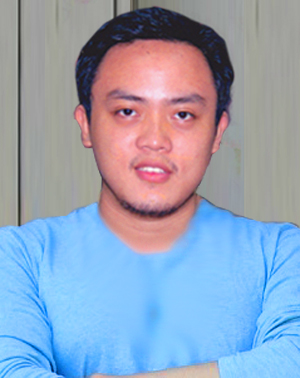
- Born: May 4, 1982; Quezon City, Philippines
- Other names: Kulas, DJ Maverick
- Occupations: Producer, director, writer, composer, cinematographer, artist
- Known for: Visayan Internet Movies – Puppy Love, 8-Cinema, Takod, Pada'ng Kulas

Julius Roden is a Filipino producer and director known for his roles in creating internet movies.

== Filmography ==
=== Movies ===
Year	Title	Genre	Type	Studio	Cast	Director				
2008	Kasambahay	horror, thriller, suspense	independent film	Pagilas Entertainment Productions	Alyne Torres, Lydia Durian	Julius Roden				
2011	Offense	suspense, thriller	independent film	Pagilas Entertainment Productions	Alyne Torres, Lydia Durian	Julius Roden	independent film	Julius Roden Pictures	Gracia de Vera	Julius Roden
2012	Analysis Overload	romantic, comedy, drama	independent film	Julius Roden Pictures	Philipp Dunkel, Beige Elorde	Julius Roden	independent film	Julius Roden Pictures	Gracia de Vera	Julius Roden
2012	The Pattern	progressive, new age, horror	independent film	Julius Roden Pictures	Philipp Dunkel, Beige Elorde	Julius Roden	independent film	Julius Roden Pictures	Karlo Manalo, Khalid Gunting, Geraldine Tan	Julius Roden
2017	Masayran Na (I Shall Know)	suspense, human drama, thriller	independent film	8-Cinema short films	Zy Ceniza, Dan Lopez	Julius Roden	independent film	Julius Roden Pictures	Karlo Manalo, Khalid Gunting, Geraldine Tan	Julius Roden
2018	Bana Unta (The Husband)	human drama, erotic	independent film	8-Cinema short films	Zy Ceniza, Dan Lopez	Julius Roden	independent film	8-Cinema short films	Dan Lopez, Jolaica Amiana, Hanna Lumayag	Julius Roden
2019	Takod (The Infection)	sci-fi, horror, action	independent film	8-Cinema short films	Maina Priya, Fernando Montalvo, Yazmin Paquera	Julius Roden	independent film	8-Cinema short films	Dan Lopez, Jolaica Amiana, Hanna Lumayag	Julius Roden
2019	Takod: Samang Takna (The Infection) Scenario B	sci-fi, horror, action	independent film	8-Cinema short films	Maina Priya, Fernando Montalvo, Yazmin Paquera	Julius Roden	independent film	8-Cinema short films	Dana Sanchez, Fernando Montalvo, Yazmin Paquera	Julius Roden
2019	Takod: Magtutungha	sci-fi, horror, action	independent film	Cyflix	Ayesshia, Jana Belmonte, Roger Zamora	Julius Roden	independent film	8-Cinema short films	Dana Sanchez, Fernando Montalvo, Yazmin Paquera	Julius Roden
2019	Pada'ng Kulas	suspense, action, comedy	independent film	Cyflix	Ayesshia, Jana Belmonte, Roger Zamora	Julius Roden	independent film	8-Cinema short films	Divine Krisha, Natasha Omamalin, Xyryl, Alex Ilaya	Julius Roden

== Television ==
=== Free-to-air ===
Year	Title	Network	Cast	Director
2010	All About Adam	Intercontinental Broadcasting Corporation	Migui Moreno, Philipp Dunkel, Karlo Manalo	Julius Roden

=== Internet TV ===
Year	Title	Network	Cast	Director
2013	Shi no Kage (死の影, Shadow of Death)	World CyberVision Network	Khalid Gunting, Marvelous Alejo	Julius Roden
2013	"Angels"	World CyberVision Network	Karlo Manalo, Philipp Dunkel	Julius Roden
2014	"Ana Guada"	World CyberVision Network	Jacqueline Sayson, Khalid Gunting	Julius Roden
2015	"Puppy Love - PILOT"	World CyberVision Network	Jacqueline Sayson, Kier Carlos, Karlo Manalo	Julius Roden
2016	"Puppy Love - Supreme Girl and Prince Charming"	World CyberVision Network	Xyryl, Savannah, Lester Marte	Julius Roden
2017	"Puppy Love - More Than Words"	World CyberVision Network	Khristine Lim, AJ Mendoza, Alex Ilaya	Julius Roden
2018	"Puppy Love - Partners in Crime"	World CyberVision Network	Maina Priya, James Robert	Julius Roden
2018	"Puppy Love - Teenage High School Ninja Girls"	World CyberVision Network	Dana Sanchez, Kate Sia, John Fernan	Julius Roden
2018	"Puppy Love - Truth with Consequence"	World CyberVision Network	Mares, Romer Ezekiel	Julius Roden
