= Dan Campilan =

- Born: Danifel Manaba Campilan; November 27, 1980; Cebu City, Philippines
- Died: October 7, 2006 (aged 25); Quezon City, Philippines
- Occupation: Reporter
- Notable credit(s): Scholar, Department of Science and Technology (College)
- Website: http://www.igma.tv/celeb.php?celebid=188

Danifel Manaba Campilan (November 27, 1980 – October 7, 2006), was a radio and TV reporter for GMA Network. As a radio reporter and later as a TV reporter, Campilan was practically in the center of many upheavals and shakeups that the country has gone through, from the impeachment of former Philippine president Joseph Estrada and the swearing in of President Gloria Macapagal Arroyo to the impeachment bid of Supreme Court Chief Justice Hilario Davide.

He was a reporter in GMA Network before his death at the age of 25 in a road accident.

== Personal life ==
He was born in Mabolo, Cebu City. Work prompted him to establish residence in Tandang Sora, Quezon City, away from his family members. The eldest of six children, he helped pay for the tuition of his siblings in his native Cebu.

A scholar of the Department of Science and Technology, Campilan was a student of the Cebu Institute of Technology, Florencio Urot National High School, and Mabolo Elementary School. He was also a college activist and a member of the League of Filipino Students.

Before GMA News, Campilan worked with RPN Channel 9 for two years, and with Bombo Radyo Philippines at its Makati office.

== Career ==
He started his career in Bombo Radyo Philippines in September 1999 as a Regional Beat Reporter in Bombo Radyo Cebu and in December 1999 until 2002 he was assigned as Justice and Malacañang Beat Reporter.

Before he joined the GMA Network, he was with RPN from September 2002 as Congress Beat Reporter until in January 2004 as Justice Beat Reporter.

In his first year at GMA Network, 2004, Dan was one of Howie Severino's trainees. But he soon proved to be capable and reliable, and not needing basic training since he had significant reportorial experience at RPN and Bombo Radyo Philippines, covering Makati. His superiors first took notice of Dan as a 19-year-old cub reporter when he spent Christmas Eve and day of 1999 reporting the M/V Asia South Korea tragedy in Daanbantayan, Cebu. His idols were Christiane Amanpour and Larry King of CNN.

As a Bombo Radyo reporter covering the Edsa Tres May 1 riot, he was blinded by the teargas but found an instant, unlikely antidote: "Para mawala ang anghang sa mata, dinakot ko yung ice cream na tinitinda nung mama sa Mendiola at pinanghilamos. Nagsunuran na rin yung iba. Sorry manong, but you saved my life."

At GMA Network, he covered the first outbreak of meningococcemia in Baguio. He was also starting to distinguish himself for the stories he did for the public affairs show, Reporter's Notebook, particularly his pieces on child labor, including a story on kids working on tobacco farms in Ilocos Sur.

He had shown an interest in shooting with a camera and asked about some of the shutter effects that cameraman Egay Navarro uses. Dan liked watching documentaries.

He was a reporter of the early-evening newscast, 24 Oras & late night newscast, Saksi from July 2004 until his death in 2006. His last live appearance was on October 5, Thursday.

== Death ==
Campilan was killed while three bus passengers were wounded in a vehicular accident in Quezon City on the morning of Saturday, October 7, 2006.

Campilan was driving along Quirino Highway in Lagro, Novaliches, when his Toyota Corolla (TBW-155) crashed into an oncoming Mayamy bus (CVK-827) around 5:30 a.m.

The driver of the Manila-bound Mayamy Bus, identified as Danilo de Vera-Cruz, surrendered to responding traffic policemen. He is under investigation pending the filing of reckless imprudence resulting in homicide case against him.

The three injured passengers of the bus have yet to be identified as of posting time.

Witnesses said Campilan's car overtook another vehicle but failed to steer clear of the fast approaching bus and rammed straight into it. The car was wedged under the bus, the report said.

The militant Bagong Alyansang Makabayan (Bayan) conveyed its condolences to the family, friends and colleagues of Campilan.

Renato Reyes, Bayan spokesman, disclosed that before becoming a reporter for GMA 7, Campilan was a member of the League of Filipino Students (LFS) in Cebu.

"We remember Dan for covering major rallies and mobilizations this year such as the State of the Nation Address (SONA) and the Sept. 21 protest against political killings. He was conscientious in his coverage of rallies, paying attention to speeches and not minding the difficulties of rain, long marches and even violent dispersals by the police. It was at the Sept. 21 rally where we last saw Dan", Bayan said in a statement.

Dr. Jose Tito Marasigan, attending physician, said Campilan was taken to San Lorenzo General Hospital following the crash at 6:10 A.M. but he succumbed to death around 7:40 A.M.

Radio station DZBB said that Campilan's remains will be brought home to Cebu after two days.

Campilan's remains was taken to the Funeraria Nacional on Araneta Avenue in Quezon City before he was on Cebu City.

On October 11, 2006, his body was brought back to Villamor Airbase for transport to his hometown, Cebu City, for burial.

He was interred on Sunday, October 15, 2006, at Queen City Memorial Garden in Cebu City.

== See also ==
- Radio Philippines Network
- RPN News and Public Affairs
- RPN Arangkada Balita
- RPN NewsWatch
- GMA Network
- GMA News and Public Affairs
- 24 Oras
- Saksi
