= Rodolfo Fernández (footballer) =

Paraguayan footballer (born 1979)

Personal information
- Full name: Rodolfo Alberto Fernández Durand
- Date of birth: March 11, 1979 (age 47)
- Place of birth: Asunción, Paraguay
- Height: 1.84 m (6 ft 0 in)
- Position: Forward

Senior career*
| Years | Team | Apps | (Gls) |
| 1995–2003 | Cerro Corá | | |
| 2000 | → Resistencia (loan) | | |
- → Sol de América (loan)
| 2003–2004 | FAS | | |
| 2003–2004 | FAS B | | |
| 2004 | Fernando de la Mora | | (1) |
| 2005 | Deportes Ovalle | 24 | (11) |
| 2006–2008 | San Luis | 48 | (8) |
| 2008 | Sportivo Trinidense | | |
| 2009 | Resistencia | | |
| 2009 | Sol de América | 3 | (0) |
| 2010–2011 | San Lorenzo | | |
| 2011 | San Marcos | 4 | (0) |
- * Club domestic league appearances and goals

Rodolfo Alberto Fernández Durand (born March 11, 1979) is a Paraguayan former footballer who played as a forward.

== Teams ==
- (Paraguay) Cerro Corá 1995–2003
- (Paraguay) Resistencia 2000 (loan)
- (Paraguay) Sol de América (loan)
- (El Salvador) FAS 2003–2004
- (El Salvador) FAS B 2003–2004
- (Paraguay) Fernando de la Mora 2004
- (Chile) Deportes Ovalle 2005
- (Chile) San Luis de Quillota 2006–2008
- (Paraguay) Sportivo Trinidense 2008
- (Paraguay) Resistencia 2009
- (Paraguay) Sol de América 2009
- (Paraguay) San Lorenzo 2010–2011
- (Chile) San Marcos de Arica 2011
