= 1980 Philippine Kabataang Barangay elections =

Kabataang Barangay elections (KB) were held on May 26, 1980, in which about 3 million Filipino youths aged 15 to 18 years old participated. Each Barangay in the Philippines is mandated by law to have its own chapter of the Katipunan ng Kabataan in which the members elect their officers called as the Kabataang Barangay.

== Resources ==
- G.R. No. 108399 - Alunan III, et al. vs. Mirasol, et al.
- Background of the Kabataang Barangay

== See also ==
- Commission on Elections
- Politics of the Philippines
- Philippine elections
