= Mielparque =

Japanese hotel chain

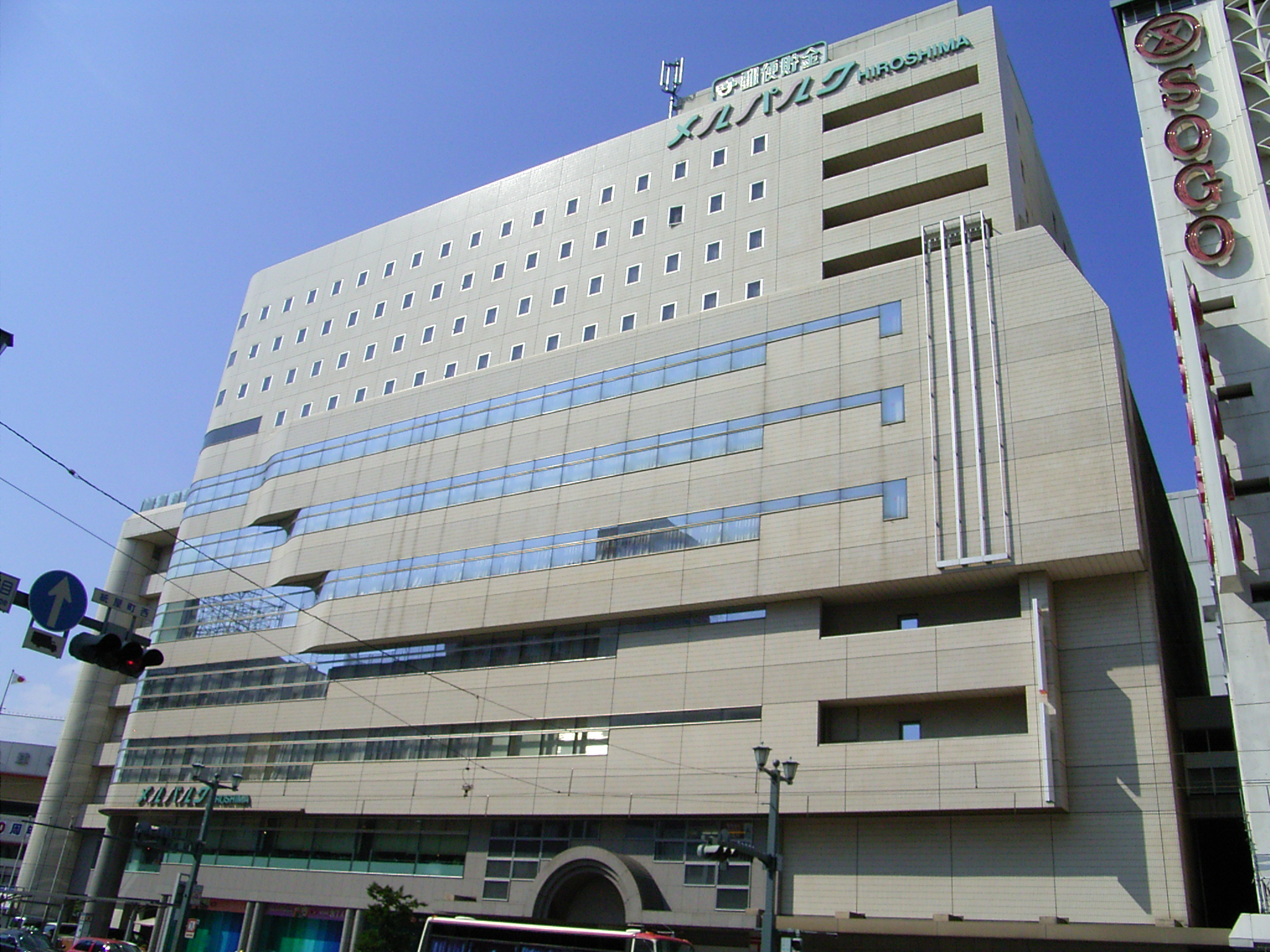
Mielparque Hiroshima in Hiroshima, Hiroshima Prefecture

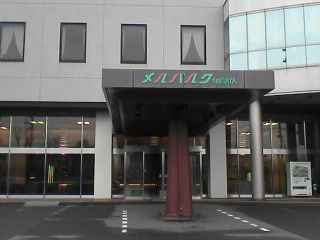
Mielparque Niigata in Niigata, Niigata Prefecture

Mielparque (メルパルク Meruparuku) is a Japanese hotel chain.

Mielparque operates hotels throughout Honshū, Shikoku, and Kyūshū.
