= All About Adam (TV series) =

Filipino television series

- Created by: Julius Roden
- Starring: Migui Moreno; Philipp Dunkel; Jeffrey Canlas; Michael Ignacio; Karlo Manalo; Martin Mendoza
- Country of origin: Philippines

Production
- Executive producer: Julius Roden
- Running time: 48-50 minutes
- Production company: Pagilas Entertainment Productions

Original release
- Network: IBC
- Release: 31 October 2010 – May 2011

All About Adam is a Filipino comedy television series created by Julius Roden. It aired on IBC from 31 October 2010 to May 2011. The series focuses on four young men, Jeremy, Drew, Josh and Paulo, who live together and deal with their respective careers while maneuvering their lives as each experiences ambition, betrayal, secrecy, money, fame, and sex.

== Premise ==
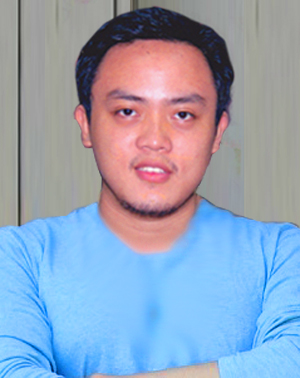
Julius Roden

In early 2010, writer/producer/director Julius Roden set a meeting with independent film artists Jude Faith and Chris Lucas. The intention was to create a boy band, but the focus soon shifted to the creation of a new television series. Roden thought about making a television movie about five bachelors with different careers, inspired by the late 1980s hit Filipino sitcom Palibhasa Lalake. However, the producer thought it would be better to create an extended television series rather than a single movie.

After various attempts for the cast, Roden found Migui Moreno and filming for the pilot began.

== Synopsis ==
In the pilot episode, Josh and Jeremy are introduced as underground heavy metal musicians hoping to get a record deal from a big time producer while Paulo and Drew get involved with a mysterious vixen and her connection to the suicide case of Christian Jacob that Sgt. Yoga Sabarita and Inspector Laura Marasigan are investigating.

The two flamboyant Adams deny their sexual engagement with the mysterious vixen, but the police officers remained skeptical.

== Cast ==
Migui Moreno

Moreno is an actor in television, films, theater and commercials. He is a former member of the 1990s Filipino boy band Idolzone, a former member of the That's Entertainment cast, and was the star of Carlo J. Caparas' Kroko: Takas Sa Zoo, which was shown at the same network (IBC-13). He is also known for his performances in Gantimpala Theater.

In All About Adam, Moreno plays Paulo Morales, a charismatic and flirtatious character known for his wild personality. He is the "Pinoy cowboy" and he loves hot beautiful women.

Philipp Dunkel

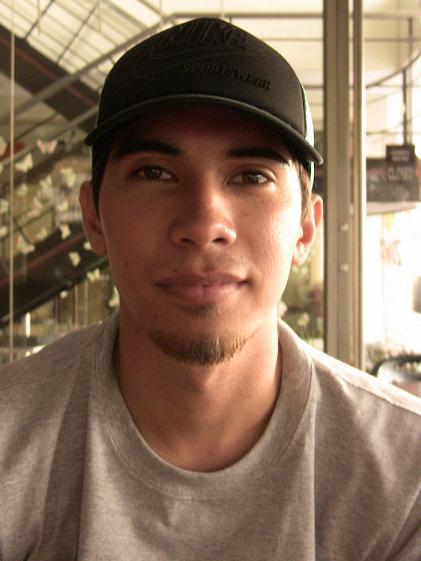
Philipp Dunkel

Dunkel was rejected twice by Roden in the auditions but filming was about to start and still, no actor was available. On his third audition and screen test, the lead vocalist of the heavy metal underground band United By Fate made it. In All About Adam, the half-Filipino half-German actor/musician is Jeremy Cabrera.

Jeffrey Canlas

Canlas is the vocalist of the alternative rock band Ethigma. Like Dunkel, Jeffrey's band used to be heavy metal but change of directions led their music to a different genre. He had met previously met Adam producer Roden in 2009 at a recording studio. When it came time to cast Adam, Roden sought out Canlas to be part of the cast.

In All About Adam, Canlas plays Josh Jimenez, the best friend of Jeremy Cabrera and vocalist of their rock band.

Michael Ignacio

Ignacio was chosen by Roden during the cyber audition of All About Adam. He landed the part of Drew Smith – a gym instructor and the less sex party animal version of Paulo Morales. Despite being a registered nurse, Michael opted for the world of entertainment and he had performed in several theatrical productions such as director Tony Espejo's Beauty and the Beast, in which he played the character Gaston.

Karlo Manalo

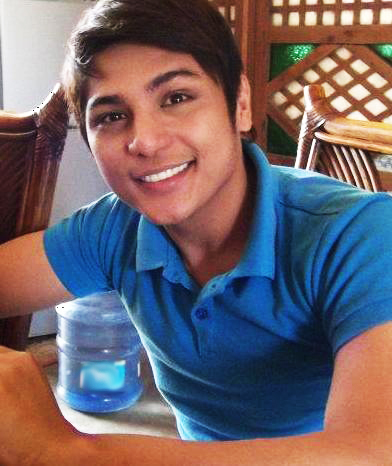
Karlo Manalo

Originally chosen by Roden to play Drew Smith in the television movie of All About Adam. But due to conflicts in filming schedules, he played the brief and groundbreaking role of an HIV victim named Christian Jacob. Before joining All About Adam, Karlo Manalo became very controversial when Vice Ganda hit on him and went tumbling backward on national television in 2009 on a Filipino talent show titled Showtime. His striking appearance caught the attention of the host/judge. Manalo was then tagged as The Man who made Vice Ganda go GaGa.

Martin Mendoza

Mendoza joins the cast of All About Adam the series in its first full season. He plays Archie Sandoval, an aspiring writer/journalist. However, because of his boyish looks and a body like a ramp model, most people in newspaper and magazine companies never take him seriously.

== See also ==
- List of programs broadcast by Intercontinental Broadcasting Corporation
