= Rudy Fernandez (labor leader) =

Filipino labor leader and trade unionist

Rudolfo A. Fernandez, Sr.
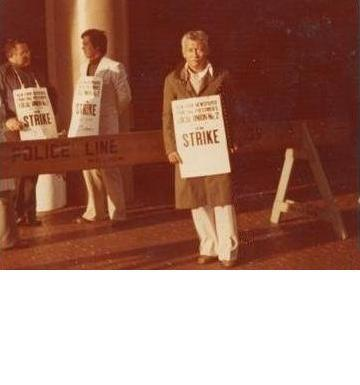
- Fernandez at a labor strike in New York City, NY, October 1978
- Born: July 26, 1927; Sibonga, Cebu, Philippine Islands
- Died: June 9, 1979 (aged 51); Cebu City, Cebu, Philippines
- Other name: Rudy Fernandez
- Occupations: Labor leader, trade unionist
- Years active: 1967–1979
- Organization: Trade Union Congress of the Philippines
- Political party: Liberal
- Spouse(s): Antonia Valenton Militante (1951–1968; separated); Vivian Alvar (1968–1979)

Rudolfo Austria “Rudy” Fernandez, Sr. (July 26, 1927 – June 9, 1979) was a prominent Filipino labor leader, trade unionist and staunch opposer of the late President Ferdinand Marcos in Davao City, Philippines. He was one of the original organizers of the Trade Union Congress of the Philippines (TUCP/KMP) in 1975 and helped draft, develop, and establish its constitution and by-laws. He first came into the Philippine labor movement arena when he founded the Davao Port General & Transport Worker’s Union (DPGTWU), now the Association of Trade Unions - TUCP (ATU-TUCP), in Davao City. DPGTWU was one of the most active labor organizations in Davao City and its membership spread throughout Mindanao in the Southern Philippines during the years between 1967 and 1979. He ran for the Interim Batasang Pambansa (IBP) in the Philippines in 1978 as an Industrial Labor Sectoral Representative for the Mindanao Region but ultimately lost against his closest rival, Princess Porti Pacasum, daughter of one of the richest Lanao Muslim clans and owner of the biggest transport company in Lanao, Philippines.

== Early life and career ==
Rudolfo A. Fernandez, Sr. was born in Sibonga, Cebu on July 26, 1927, to a prominent clan of landowners. His father, Mateo Fernandez, was a local police constable and his mother, Magdalena Austria, was a housewife. During his grade school years, Rudy was bright and became active in debates and oratorical contests. During World War II (1945–1947), the young Fernandez, still in his teens, made use of his expertise in the English language and became the local messenger and interpreter between the American troops and the guerillas who were fighting against the Japanese Occupational forces. Fernandez dreamed of becoming a boxer and left his hometown to join a carnival in the hope of becoming one. He was found and brought home by his father, Mateo, who implored him to finish his studies since it was where he excelled. Also while in his teens, Fernandez joined his older brother Vitaliano Fernandez, a prominent Civil Engineer in Cebu City, to continue his tertiary education at the University of the Visayas. He left the university and migrated to Davao City, Southern Philippines to be with his other brother Ramon Fernandez, Sr. and worked in his stevedoring business to pursue his dream of becoming a lawyer.

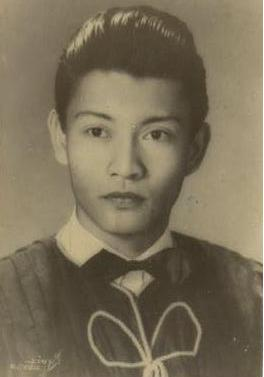
Fernandez as a 20-year-old university student at IHU c. 1947.

He studied law at the International Harvardian University (IHU) in Davao City where he met his soon-to-be wife, Antonia Valenton Militante, the local campus belle at that same university and was in her senior year in high school. Fernandez soon became the president of their University's debate team and further improved his skill in speech and argumentation. This flair for discourse in the young Fernandez would be very instrumental in his becoming a skilled Labor organizer. The young Fernandez and Antonia were frequently seen in local clubs and parties and were always the center of these gatherings. Fernandez together with his wit and charm, was also known to be an exceptional dancer. He eventually married Antonia on November 10, 1951. The couple had eleven children named: Matthew, Rodolfo, Jr., Ruby Carmen, Ivan, Hope, Faith, Charity, Strauss, Pearl, Ruth and Rodolfo, III. He became a court stenographer of the local circuit court. His apprenticeship in the Labor movement was honed in the defunct Mindanao Congress of Labor as a labor organizer, then he joined the Philippine Labor Express as a columnist, and also became a radio reporter. Because of his growing family, he soon had to quit college. Fernandez and his wife Antonia separated in 1968. Later, he had two more children, Dean and Lynn, with his common-law wife, Vivian Alvar. Fernandez also became the secretary of then-Congressman Ismael Veloso (NP). Despite his serious years as secretary of Congressman Veloso, Fernandez never lost his devil-may-care attitude. He kept on attending club parties and went on to join club dance showdowns and charmed everyone. It was at this time in his life that Fernandez met and frequently partnered with Nida Blanca, one of Manila's most beautiful women and the queen of the city's club dance showdowns. However, Fernandez’ stint in the Mindanao Congress of Labor urged him to leave Manila and continued to pique his interest in the Labor Movement.

== The labor movement ==
Rudolfo A. "Rudy" Fernandez, Sr. eventually became an active Labor organizer in Davao becoming fully aware of the unhealthy and unlawful practices of the local companies and industries towards their workers and employees. Workers and or laborers during those times in Davao were predominantly oblivious of their basic legal rights and how to attain them and companies aware of this fact, were mostly abusing this ignorance. He founded his own labor organization called the Davao Port, General & Transport Worker’s Union (DPGTWU) with the mission of stamping out all forms of oppression against local workers and educate them of their basic legal rights and on organized labor. DPGTWU was then organized and Fernandez was elected as its first president in 1965.

In 1964, Fernandez’ suffered a massive cardiac arrest and became paralyzed. He was confined in the hospital for almost 3 months and was under physical therapy for almost 6 and then gained back his strength to walk again and continue his efforts as a Labor Leader. Some of his loyal supporters said that Rudy defied death even while already in its brink because of his burning refusal to die. Fernandez’ brush with death, they say, was the turning point of his life. DPGTWU flourished and gained a large union membership in the Lumber Industry (i.e. Santa Clara Lumber Co., Kalinan Timber Corp. of the Consunji Family, etc.), the Food Production and Agricultural Industry (i.e., London Biscuit Co. LONBISCO), and in the local Automotive Industry (i.e., Davao Motor Sales Inc. (DAMOSA), etc. Fernandez gained a reputation of being a tough negotiator in collective bargaining agreements with companies or industries he was dealing with then. He would further become known as a champion of workers in Davao City and was also recognized as a resilient and honest man. He marshaled his union into big companies and industries and was often offered bribes which he refused, by some of their owners so as not to organize a union in their companies. Instead of getting crossed for gaining access in his companies, Don Antonio O. Floirendo, Sr., the owner of the then Davao Motor Sales Corporation (DAMOSA) and Anflocor and one of the richest men in the country, became one of his staunchest ally and friend, and soon further gained his trust and friendship. Don Florendo could not forget Fernandez' quip when he once told him that he is quite good in what he is doing and Fernandez answered him, "I should be, I worked hard to get to where I am now." The former said, Fernandez' remark was uttered without afterthought just as if it was just that, a certainty, so sure of himself. Florendo further related that is how Fernandez instills confidence to people who hears and listen to him: by the firmness of his voice when he talks and that, is a gift of gab. Having gained recognition in the labor movement, he was frequently invited into Davao City’s important occasions and gained the friendship as well as enmity of local politicians, broadcasters and prominent clans because of his often frank and fearless comments against the Marcos dictatorship and the local political scenery. It was during these gatherings that he befriended the country’s future Speaker of the House, Prospero Nograles, Davao City's former Mayor and the Department of the Interior and Local Government (DILG) Secretary of the Philippines' 11th President Corazon Aquino’s cabinet, Mayor Luis T. Santos and Ernesto Macasaet, Davao City’s Chief of Police, who eventually became a good friend of his. Maintaining his empathy towards the workingmen he had sworn to serve, he was known to offer generous help to them keeping his home constantly open whenever they come to him for food and provide whatever assistance he could give. Due to Fernandez’ open criticisms against the Marcos' dictatorship and his close association with Davao City's local Liberal Party Chapter, his house and residence in Talomo, Davao City was raided by the Military and searched the next day after Marcos declared Martial Law in 1972, with an alleged tip that he was hiding an arsenal of guns. A wildfire of rumors spread in Davao City that he was going to be arrested for illegal possession of firearms or for any other drummed up charges. But, Fernandez using his knack in diplomacy defused the tension that arose at that time and the Military left his residence finding nothing and left him alone to carry on with his labor pursuits.

In 1973, Fernandez wrote an original oratory, “The Role of the Youth in the New Society” which was delivered by his second son Rodolfo, Jr., and won second place in the Philippines’ National Oratorical Contest for all Naval ROTC on October 20, 1973, held at the Philippine Navy Headquarters in Manila. The brilliant piece is still kept in the archives of the Philippine Women's University, Manila to this day.

Over the next few years despite Fernandez being a very vocal opponent and his oppositionist leaning, the government supported collective bargaining, and the regulation of the minimum wages and strikes were still allowed although constrained. (QUOTE) DPGTWU flourished and spread and he soon made frequent trips to Manila in order to exchange ideas and ideologies among his fellow labor leaders in the Philippine’s capital city, among them Senator Blas F. Ople, the Secretary of Labor during that time, Democrito T. Mendoza, National President of TUCP-KMP, Ernesto Herrera, Secretary-General of TUCP-KMP, who would soon become a senator in the country, the activist Luis Taruc and Eulogio R. Lerum, Sr., Chief Legal Counsel of TUCP-KMP. The Trade Union Congress of the Philippines (TUCP) was soon organized. It became the labor center to represent labor in the tripartite system of labor relations in the country under the period of labor repression. Fernandez helped organized and established the Trade Union Congress of the Philippines (TUCP/KMP) and aided, wrote and improved its constitution and by-laws. Fernandez was elected as one of TUCP’s Vice Presidents and was chosen to represent the country as a Labor Observer in Europe in 1976 which was sponsored by the International Labour Organization (ILO). Fernandez, together with his fellow Asian Labor Representatives, visited Yugoslavia and ILO’s main offices in Geneva, Switzerland. Back in the Philippines, despite being swamped with labor work, Fernandez, a Roman Catholic and a known devotee of the Santo Niño de Cebú (Holy Child of Cebu), never fails to visit the Basilica where it is ensconced. This has been one of Fernandez' generally recognized proclivities and a quirk which he had developed during his later years, wherein he never goes to church in any other place nor province except in the Basilica del Sto. Nino located in Cebu City.

In April 1978, Fernandez ran as a sectoral assemblyman for the Industrial Labor Sector, Mindanao Region in the Interim Batasang Pambansa (IBP)’s Philippine parliamentary elections and was a favorite among all the provincial governors of Mindanao to win. He eventually lost to Princess Porti Pacasum of Lanao, Philippines, the daughter of one of its biggest transport companies despite being the favored candidate to win. Fernandez a defeated man became literally old overnight. He was so sure of winning due to the strong support of 90% of the Mindanao governors spearheaded by Gov. Nonito D. Llanos, Sr., then governor of Davao del Sur and their electoral representatives. He suspected that the win was due to vote-buying, a common political strategy in the Philippines’ political setting. Fernandez then decided to file an electoral protest to the Commission on Elections and was quite confident that it will result in his favor. The evening before he was about to file the protest, the then First Lady Imelda Marcos, visited Fernandez who was accompanied by his daughter Faith in Manila, and swayed him not to go through with the protest because it might get the ire of the Muslim population in Mindanao. Since Mindanao is predominantly Muslim, she said it would be best that a Muslim should win. Fernandez suspected that Imelda Marcos wanted Pacasum to win, because Mrs. Marcos was active in the Mindanao Peace efforts at that time and it would look good in her peace efforts. Knowing that the Marcos government is behind Pacasum and realizing their influence, Fernandez didn’t continue filing the election protest and headed back to Davao City a disillusioned man.

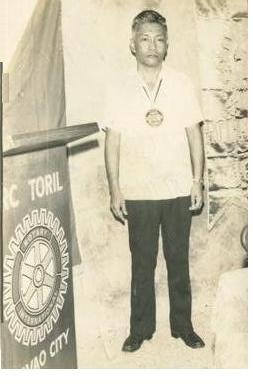
Fernandez as President of the Rotary Club of Toril, Davao City c. 1977.

It was during this period in his life that his heart illness became worst. After the IBP elections, Fernandez continued with his unrelenting labor efforts and DPGTWU remained highly regarded and robust. He nonetheless went to another observation trip to the US representing TUCP/KMP in October 1978 upon the sponsorship of the Asian American Free Labor Institute (AAFLI) and toured 14 cities some of which were, Washington, D.C., New York City, and Chicago. The observation trip was cut short when he suffered a pulmonary heart attack in Chicago and was soon flown back to the Philippines by TUCP/KMP after being hospitalized for a brief period there. Meanwhile, during his term as president of DPGTWU, he was also elected as the President of the local Rotary International's District 3860 Toril, Davao City (then a municipality of Davao) in 1977. He further ran for the local Barangay elections in Talomo District, Davao City as Barangay Captain but then lost the seat to a local moneyed favorite.

== Death and legacy ==
Fernandez, with his health in decline and defiant of his doctors' wishes continued with his labor efforts and was still active in DPGTWU and TUCP/KMP in late 1978 and early 1979. He felt he was invincible and he never believed that death would overcome him. During a stop-over to Cebu City, in one of his frequent trips and visiting one of his daughters studying in Cebu, he suffered a severe stroke upon disembarking from a plane in Mactan–Cebu International Airport’s tarmac. He was rushed to the nearest Perpetual Succour Hospital and was pronounced dead on arrival (DOA) on June 9, 1979, at 10:00 in the morning. A wake was held in Cebu for most of his relatives there and his body was flown to Davao City to be with his family and children. Buried at the Davao Memorial Park, his burial was attended by Davao’s prominent citizens, some of TUCP-KMP’s officers and his fellow workingmen. He used to say in one of his frequent monologues that he had always wanted to die in his hometown and he got his wish when he died in Cebu City. He left behind 13 children and two wives and a legacy of strength, integrity and wisdom within the Philippine’s labor movement, his family & friends, and his compatriots.

== See also ==
The Library of Congress Country Studies; CIA World Fact Book
