= Republic Day (Philippines) =

Commemoration in the Philippines

Philippine Republic Day
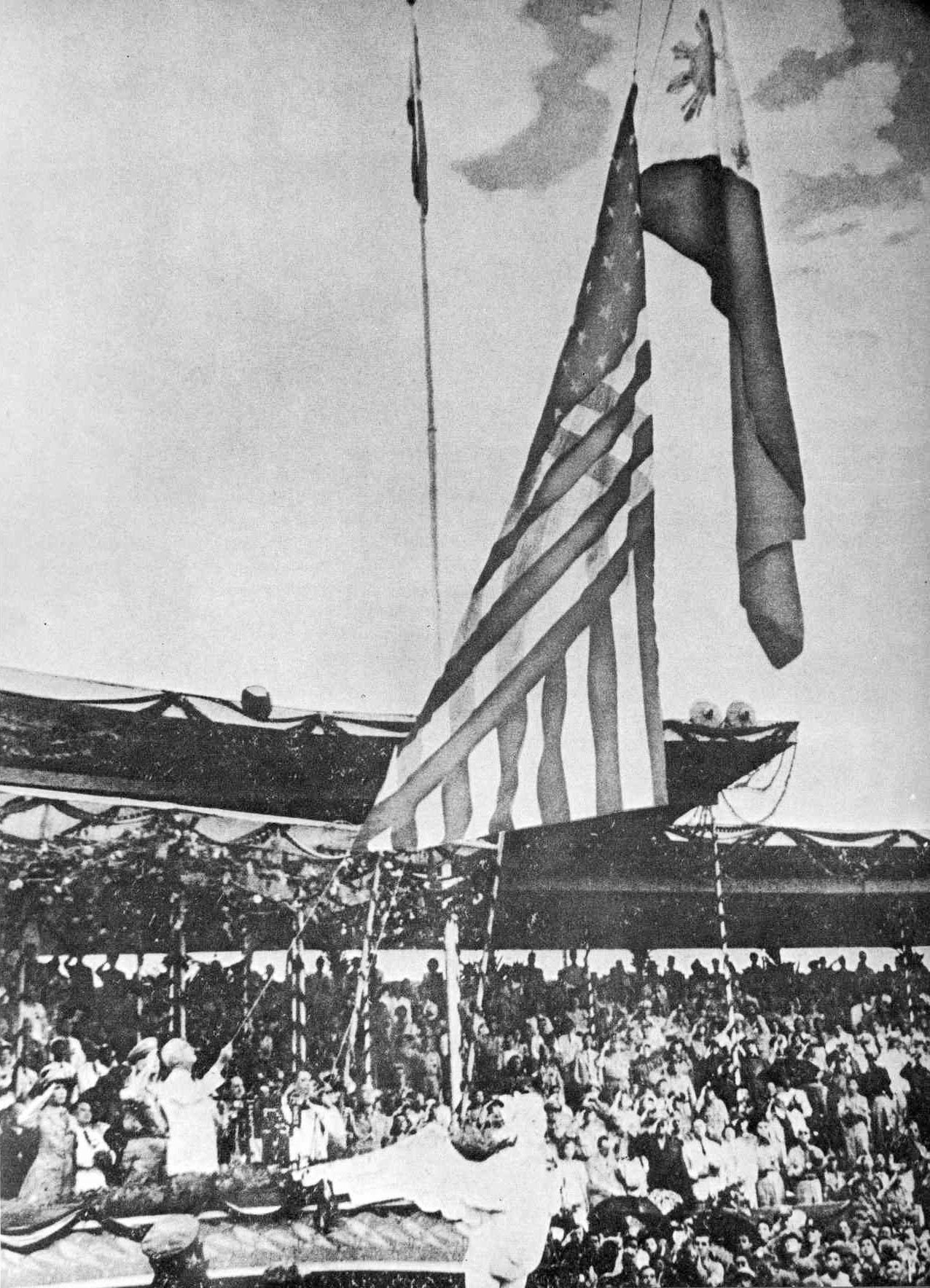
- The Flag of the United States is lowered by Paul V. McNutt while the Flag of the Philippines is being raised by Manuel Roxas during independence ceremonies, July 4, 1946.
- Official name: Republic Day
- Also called: Filipino–American Friendship Day
- Observed by: Philippines
- Type: Secular, heritage, governmental
- Significance: Initially, celebration of the establishment of the Republic of the Philippines on July 4, 1946; Later, celebration of friendship between the peoples of the Philippines and the United States
- Date: July 4
- Next time: July 4, 2027
- Frequency: annual

Philippine Republic Day (Tagalog: Araw ng Republikang Pilipino), also known as Philippine–American Friendship Day, is a commemoration in the Philippines held annually on July 4. It was formerly an official holiday designated as Independence Day, celebrating the signing of the Treaty of Manila, which granted Philippine independence from the United States of America in 1946. In 1962, President Diosdado Macapagal proclaimed June 12 as the country's Independence Day to commemorate the 1898 declaration of independence, and in 1964 the July 4 observance was renamed Republic Day.

== Background ==
The Philippine Islands were an American colonial possession from 1898 to 1946, first as a territory and then as a commonwealth beginning in 1935. Between 1941 and 1945 during the Second World War, the Empire of Japan occupied the Islands; the Commonwealth government-in-exile headed by President Manuel L. Quezon was based in Australia and later in the United States.

A campaign to retake the country began in October 1944, when General Douglas MacArthur landed in Leyte along with Sergio Osmeña, who had succeeded to the presidency after Quezon's death on August 1, 1944. The battles entailed long fierce fighting; some of the Japanese continued to fight until the official surrender of Japan on September 2, 1945. The country gained complete independence on July 4, 1946.

== Observance ==
Philippines Independence Proclaimed, July 4, 1946

Initially, the nation's Independence Day holiday (Araw ng Kalayaan) was held on July 4. President Diosdado Macapagal moved it to June 12, the date in 1898 on which Emilio Aguinaldo issued the Philippine Declaration of Independence from Spain. Philippine Republic Day was created in its place and kept as a holiday under Macapagal, coinciding with the United States' own Independence Day.

In 1955, President Ramon Magsaysay had issued Presidential Proclamation No. 212, s. 1955, which established the observance of Philippine American Day every November 15—the anniversary of the inauguration of the Commonwealth. Sometime under the rule of President Ferdinand Marcos, Philippine–American Day was renamed "Philippine–American Friendship Day" and moved to July 4, overshadowing the observance of the date as Republic Day. After the 1935 Constitution was suspended under martial law and later superseded by the 1972 Constitution, it was impolitic to remind the nation of the old Third Republic. This is why, when President Marcos issued Presidential Proclamation No. 2346 s. 1984, reference was made to Philippine–American Friendship Day, which was relegated to a working holiday without mention of Republic Day.

In 1996, President Fidel V. Ramos celebrated the day as Republic Day.

== Delisting ==
The practice of celebrating Philippine–American Friendship Day and Republic Day as a non-working holiday was formally abolished in 1987 under President Corazon Aquino. Section 26 of the Administrative Code of 1987 specified a list of regular holidays and nationwide special days that did not include July 4.

== New holiday ==
On January 9, 2013, President Benigno Aquino III issued Proclamation No. 533, declaring January 23 as "Araw ng Republikang Pilipino" (Philippine Republic Day), the anniversary of the proclamation of the First Philippine Republic.

On April 5, 2018, President Rodrigo Duterte signed Republic Act No. 11014, declaring January 23 of every year as "First Philippine Republic Day," making it a special working holiday nationwide.

== See also ==
- Araw ng Kalayaan on June 12 – the current Independence Day
- Bell Trade Act
- Philippine-American Friendship Day Parade
- Philippines–United States relations
- Public holidays in the Philippines
