= September 1984 Welcome Rotonda protest dispersal =

The September 1984 Welcome Rotonda protest dispersal was a landmark incident which happened on September 27, 1984, near the end of the administration of Ferdinand Marcos, in which pro-Marcos forces hosed down and fired tear gas on several thousand peaceful protesters gathered at Welcome Rotonda, a roundabout on the border between the City of Manila and Quezon City. They also fired into the crowd. Student leader Fidel Nemenzo was shot in the back, eventually recovering from the M-16 bullet that hit his liver, diaphragm and lungs.

The protesters included 80-year-old former Senator Lorenzo Tañada and 71-year old Manila Times founder Chino Roces. Images of the event showing the two seniors struggling against the waterhosing and teargas unleashed by the pro-Marcos forces were published in Mosquito press publications such as Malaya and WE Forum, and quickly became iconic. This led to a further decline in support for Ferdinand Marcos, who was already losing significant support in the wake of assassination of Benigno Aquino the year before.

Many of the protesters prominently featured in the photo coverage would later become prominent civil society leaders and government officials. Aside from Lorenzo Tanada, Chino Roces, and Fidel Nemenzo (former Chancellor of the University of the Philippines Diliman), intellectuals, opposition leaders, artists, and journalists who participated in the rally included:

- Tañada's son (and later senator) Wigberto Tañada,
- Constitutional Convention delegate (and later Philippine Vice President) Teofisto Guingona,
- human rights lawyer (and later senator) Rene Saguisag,
- August Twenty One Movement (ATOM) and Bansang Nagkakaisa sa Diwa at Layunin (BANDILA) founder (and later Senator) Butz Aquino,
- human rights activist Ed Garcia,
- later Tarlac Governor Tingting Cojuangco,
- WE Forum photographer Lito Ocampo,
- activist and writer Susan Quimpo,
- Cebuana radio commentator Nenita Cortes-Daluz; and
- film director Behn Cervantes.

== See also ==
- Welcome Rotonda
- Bantayog ng mga Bayani
- Movement of Concerned Citizens for Civil Liberties
- 1974 Sacred Heart Novitiate raid
- 1986 People Power Revolution
