= Middle force opposition to the Marcos dictatorship =

Non-leftist group in the Philippines (1965–1986)

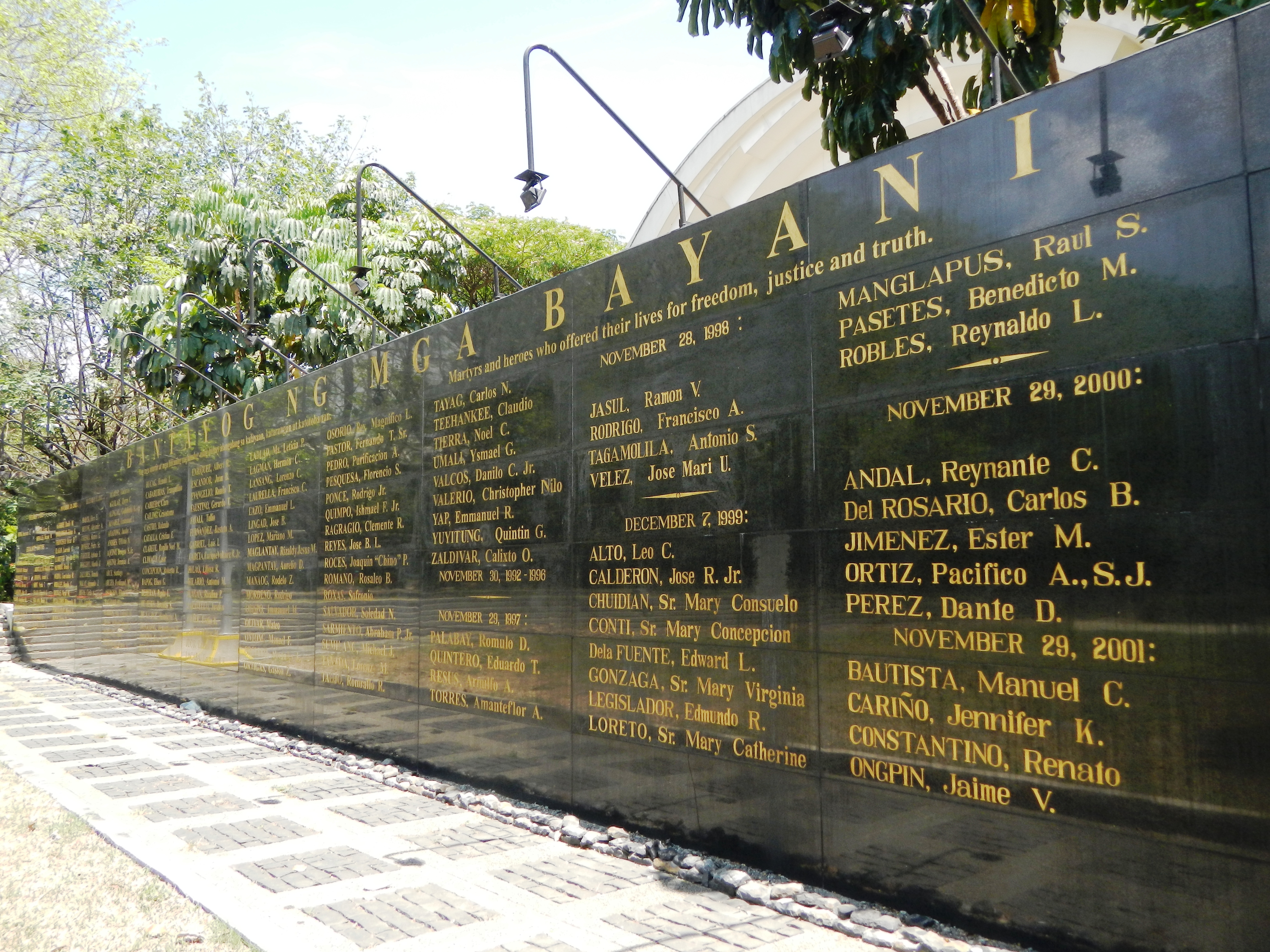
The Wall of Remembrance at the Bantayog ng mga Bayani commemorates the martyrs and heroes who fought the authoritarian regime of Ferdinand Marcos regardless of ideology. Many of the individuals honored belong to the "middle force" opposition, including religious workers, businessmen, social workers, academics, artists, mainstream opposition politicians, and journalists.

In the Philippines during the dictatorship of Ferdinand Marcos, groups and individuals which opposed the regime without subscribing to leftist ideology were usually labeled with the terms "middle force," "third force," the "mainstream opposition," the "moderates" or "centrists," or more rarely, as the "conservative opposition." Mostly consisting of middle class and upper class groups which had been apolitical when Marcos first declared martial law, the most prominent examples of oppositionists in this category include religious groups, business sector groups, professional groups, social democrats, academics, journalists, and artists. Politicians from the traditional opposition are also sometimes counted in this category, although the terms are traditionally associated with ground level opposition, rather than political opposition per se.

Most of these groups rejected the use of armed force in their opposition to the Marcos regime, most prominently the religious and business sector groups, and the various academics, journalists, and artists who voiced opposition to the regime. But there were also a number of small groups who briefly took up arms against the regime without aligning themselves to the national democracy movement.

These middle forces were mostly considered as having been "awakened" some years after Marcos' declaration of Martial Law, compared to the National Democracy movement and the Moro independence movements which were already organizing in the years before Martial Law. Key incidents noted to have convinced these groups to organize themselves in opposition to Marcos include the 1974 Sacred Heart Novitiate raid; the press coverage of the Murder of Macli-ing Dulag; the crackdown on peaceful demonsgtrations such as the September 1984 Welcome Rotonda protest dispersal; election irregularities during the 1978 Philippine parliamentary election and the 1981 Philippine presidential election and referendum; and most prominently the economic crashes of the late 1970s and early 1980s; and the assassination of Ninoy Aquino.

These "middle forces" continued to gain momentum, culminating in a civil disobedience campaign after irregularities during the 1986 Philippine presidential election. This civil disobedience campaign eventually snowballed into the 1986 People Power Revolution which finally ousted Marcos from power and led to the formation of the Fifth Philippine Republic.

== Background ==
=== Martial law under Ferdinand Marcos ===
Barred from running for a third term as president in 1973, Marcos announced Proclamation No. 1081 on September 23, 1972, declaring martial law, using the civil unrest that arose after the 1969 Philippine balance of payments crisis as a justification for the proclamation.

Through this decree and through a controversial referendum in which citizen assemblies voted through a show of hands, Marcos seized emergency powers giving him full control of the Philippines' military and the authority to suppress and abolish the freedom of speech, the freedom of the press, and many other civil liberties.

President Marcos also dissolved the Philippine Congress and shut down media establishments critical of the Marcos Administration. He also ordered the immediate arrest of his political opponents and critics. Among those arrested were Senate President Jovito Salonga, and the leaders Senator Jose W. Diokno and Senator Benigno Aquino Jr. — whom Marcos sent to Laur, Nueva Ecija — and the man who was groomed by the opposition to succeed President Marcos after the 1973 elections.

A constitutional convention, which had been called for in 1970 to replace the Commonwealth-era 1935 Constitution, continued the work of framing a new constitution after the declaration of martial law. The new constitution went into effect in early 1973, changing the form of government from presidential to parliamentary and allowing President Marcos to stay in power beyond 1973. The constitution was approved by 95% of the voters in the Philippine constitutional plebiscite. The constitution was part of the landmark Javellana v. Executive Secretary case (G.R. No. 36142) that led to the resignation of Chief Justice Roberto Concepcion. Part of the plot of the regime involved legitimizing the military rule through the new constitution providing legislative and executive powers to the president. Simultaneously Marcos conducted the 1973 plebiscite through the simple counting of hands raised by children and adults that involved questions such as the option for more rice in lieu of constitutional affirmation.

With practically all of his political opponents arrested, out of office, and in exile, President Marcos's pre-emptive declaration of martial law in 1972 and the ratification of his new constitution by more than 95% of voters enabled Marcos to effectively legitimize his government and hold on to power for another 14 years beyond his first two terms as president. In a Cold War context, Marcos retained the support of the United States through Marcos's promise to stamp out communism in the Philippines and by assuring the United States of its continued use of military and naval bases in the Philippines.

On November 27, 1977, a military tribunal sentenced Aquino and two co-accused, NPA leaders Bernabe Buscayno (Commander Dante) and Lt. Victor Corpuz, to death by firing squad. In 1978, while still the last opposition leader yet to be released from prison at Fort Bonifacio, Aquino founded his political party, Lakas ng Bayan (abbreviated "LABAN"; English: People's Power) to run for office in the Interim Batasang Pambansa (Parliament). With the elections widely considered to have been rigged, all LABAN candidates lost as expected, including Aquino himself. In 1980, Ninoy Aquino suffered a heart attack, and was allowed to leave prison to undergo a heart bypass surgery in the United States. After the surgery, Aquino stayed in exile with his wife Corazon, and children in Boston College as a fellow for numerous American universities such as Harvard and the Massachusetts Institute of Technology.

== Inciting incidents ==
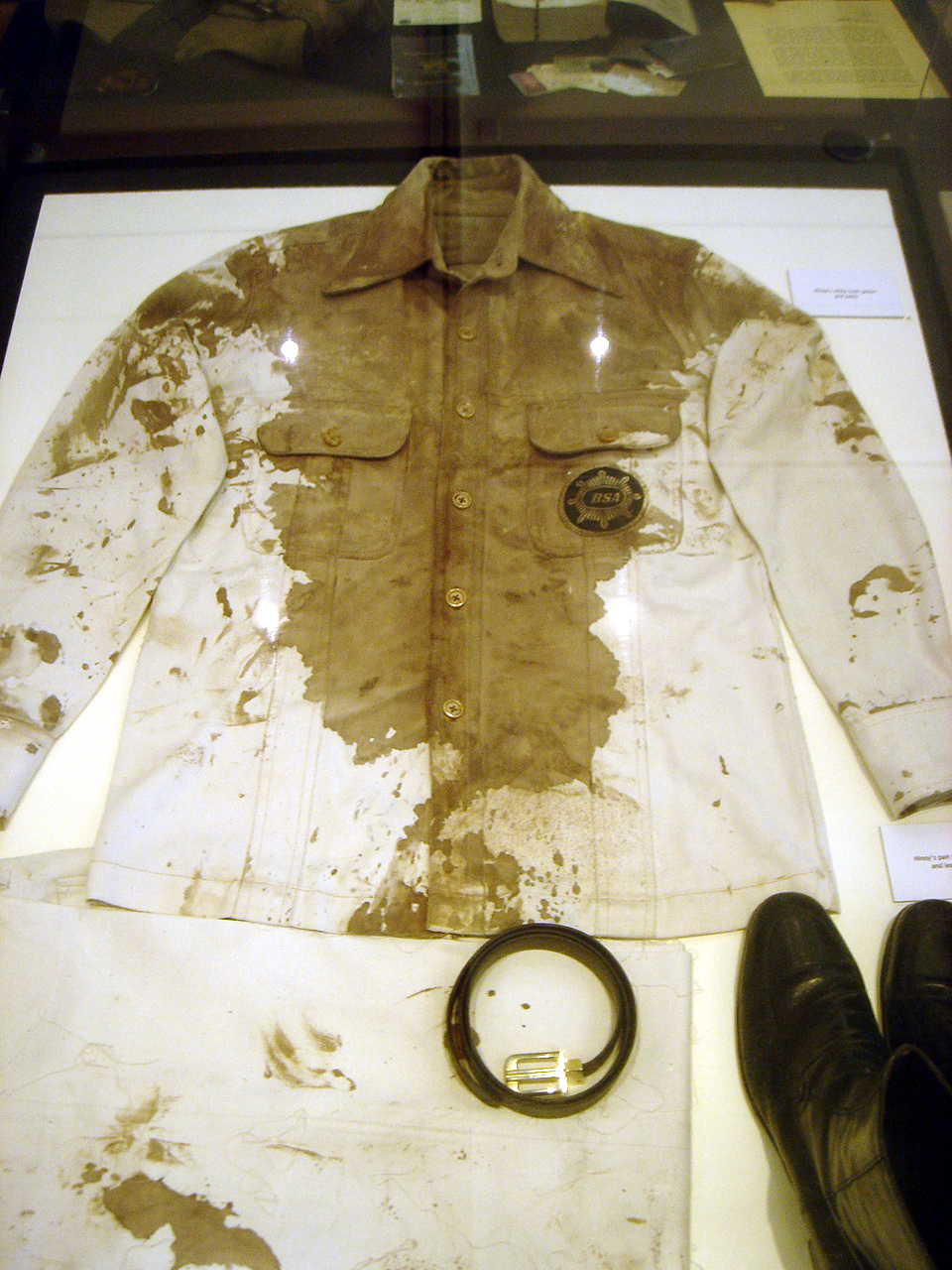
Bloodied safari jacket, pants (folded), belt, and boots worn by Ninoy Aquino upon his return from exile, on permanent display at the Aquino Center in Tarlac. Aquino's assassination upon arrival in Manila was one of the major incidents which incited the previously apolitical middle and upper classes to rise up in opposition to Ferdinand Marcos.

=== 1974 Sacred Heart Novitiate raid ===
The August 24, 1974 military raid on the Sacred Heart Novitiate in Novaliches, Quezon City is considered one of the key contributors to the emergence of the "middle force" against Ferdinand Marcos, and a key event in the Philippine Catholic church's resistance to the Marcos dictatorship.

Marcos' forces raided the Jesuit Novitiate because they had mistakenly thought a communist leader was there to attend a meeting. But when the 150 soldiers who participated in the raid did not find the communist there, they arrested a priest, Rev. Jose Blanco, S.J., and claimed he was the "secretary general of an allegedly anti-government organization." They also arrested the head of the Jesuit order in the Philippines, Benigno "Benny" Mayo, along with 21 leaders of a youth group who were attending a workshop at the seminary at the time. Newly installed Archbishop Cardinal Jaime Sin's issued a pastoral letter protesting the raid, read aloud in all the churches of the Archdiocese of Manila. It was the first act of protest by Cardinal Sin, who would later be a key opposition figure against Marcos.

=== Election irregularities in the 1978 Philippine parliamentary election ===
A parliamentary election was held in the Philippines on April 7, 1978, for the election of the 165 regional representatives to the Interim Batasang Pambansa (the nation's first parliament). The elections were participated in by the Marcos regime's party known as the Kilusang Bagong Lipunan (KBL), which was led by the then-First Lady Imelda Marcos, and the main opposition party Lakas ng Bayan (LABAN), which whose leading candidate was the jailed opposition leader Ninoy Aquino.

Conceived by the regime in response to the Carter administration's pressure against Marcos, the 1978 election would be the first major election of the Martial Law era, and the political opposition expected Marcos to cheat. As a result, Aquino's own original Liberal Party (LP) boycotted the election and only begrudgingly allowed to run under the banner of a newly formed party, LABAN. Since his LP partymates were not allowed to campaign, only his family campaigned for him in 1978.

In anticipation of cheating, a noise barrage was organized by the supporters of (LABAN) on the night before the election on April 6, 1978. Senator Nene Pimentel later explained that "the noise barrage was meant to demonstrate the people's opposition to the regime even if their votes may not be counted."

Marcos said that fraud was committed by "both sides" during the elections, but not on a scale that would have affected the results. Jovito Salonga disagreed with the assessment and said that he did not observe people celebrating KBL's victory because they felt "like they’ve been cheated."

=== The Macliing Dulag assassination ===
Coverage of Kalinga tribal leader Macli-ing Dulag's murder in April 1980 proved to be a watershed moment in the Philippine mainstream press' coverage of the Marcos regime. The story of Macli-ing's murder was most actively pursued by journalist Ma Ceres P. Doyo and playwright Rene O. Villanueva, who got the story out in the press, and were interrogated by the military as a result. Editor Leonor Aureus, writing in 1985 for the National Press Club, noted that in the decade since 1972, there had been "no open and serious confrontation between the [mainstream] press and the military following the wave of arrests after martial law was declared."

=== 1981-1986 Economic nosedive ===
The Philippine economic nosedive of the 1980s traces its roots to debt-driven growth, mostly during Marcos' second term and during the earliest years of martial law. By 1982, the Philippines’ debt was at $24.4 billion, but it had not seen much in terms of returns because of corruption and the poor management of the crony-monopolized sectors of the economy. In the third quarter of 1981, disaster for the Philippines came when the US economy went into recession, forcing the Reagan administration to increase interest rates. "Third world" countries like the Philippines and many of the nations of Latin America were highly debt dependent, and the size of their debt made debt servicing very difficult. The Philippines’ exports could not keep up with the country's debt, and the economy went into decline in 1981.

This economic decline and a succession crisis brought about by Marcos' failing health convinced Marcos' political nemesis, Benigno Aquino Jr., to try to come back from exile to try and reason with Marcos to change his policies. But Aquino was gunned down at the airport before he could even touch Philippine soil. The already-declining Philippine economy suffered further as investors went to Indonesia, Malaysia, and Thailand instead of the Philippines.

1984 and 1985 saw the worst recession in Philippine history, with the economy contracting by 7.3% for two successive years. Data from the Philippine Statistics Authority for 1985 showed that poverty incidence in families was at 44.2%—4.3 percentage points higher than in 1991 during the presidency of Corazon Aquino.

With Marcos' health going into steady decline, he gradually lost the support of his cabinet, of the Military, and by some of his closest allies. He was finally ousted by the People Power Revolution that culminated from 22 to 25 February 1986.

=== Crony capitalism and unexplained wealth ===
The economic roller coaster of the late 1970s and the economic nosedive of the early 1980s also led to public discontent relating to the influence of Ferdinand and Imelda Marcos' cronies within the Philippine economy, because of the various monopolies they established after the declaration of Martial law. While information about these monopolies was restricted during the dictatorship, Ateneo de Manila University professor Ricardo Manapat published a 48-page pamphlet titled "Some are Smarter Than Others", which exposed the details of the wealth of the Marcoses and their cronies.

The Philippine think tank the Center for Research and Communication (CRC) began tabulating figures of the Philippines' economic data in 1977 to figure out the amount of money that was being siphoned out of the economy. Using those figures, one of its cofounders Dr. Bernardo Villegas, eventually revealed in a 1985 interview with the Catholic newspaper Veritas that a conservative figure for this amount (covering 1977 to 1985) was a minimum of $13.145 Billion, while a high estimate could go as high as $30 billion. During the interview, he added that the hidden wealth was self-evident, saying "kitang kita ang ebidensya" ("the evidence is very visible"). Villegas eventually joined forces with Enrique Zobel and former ambassador Jose V. Romero Jr. to form the Makati Business Club, a forum to address economic and social policy issues which affect the development of the Philippines.

The data gathered by the CRC would later be used by US Ambassador to the Philippines Stephen Bosworth to inform his 1985 report to the United States Congress House Committee on Foreign Affairs on the rapid decline of the Philippine economy in the early 1980s.

=== The Ninoy Aquino assassination ===
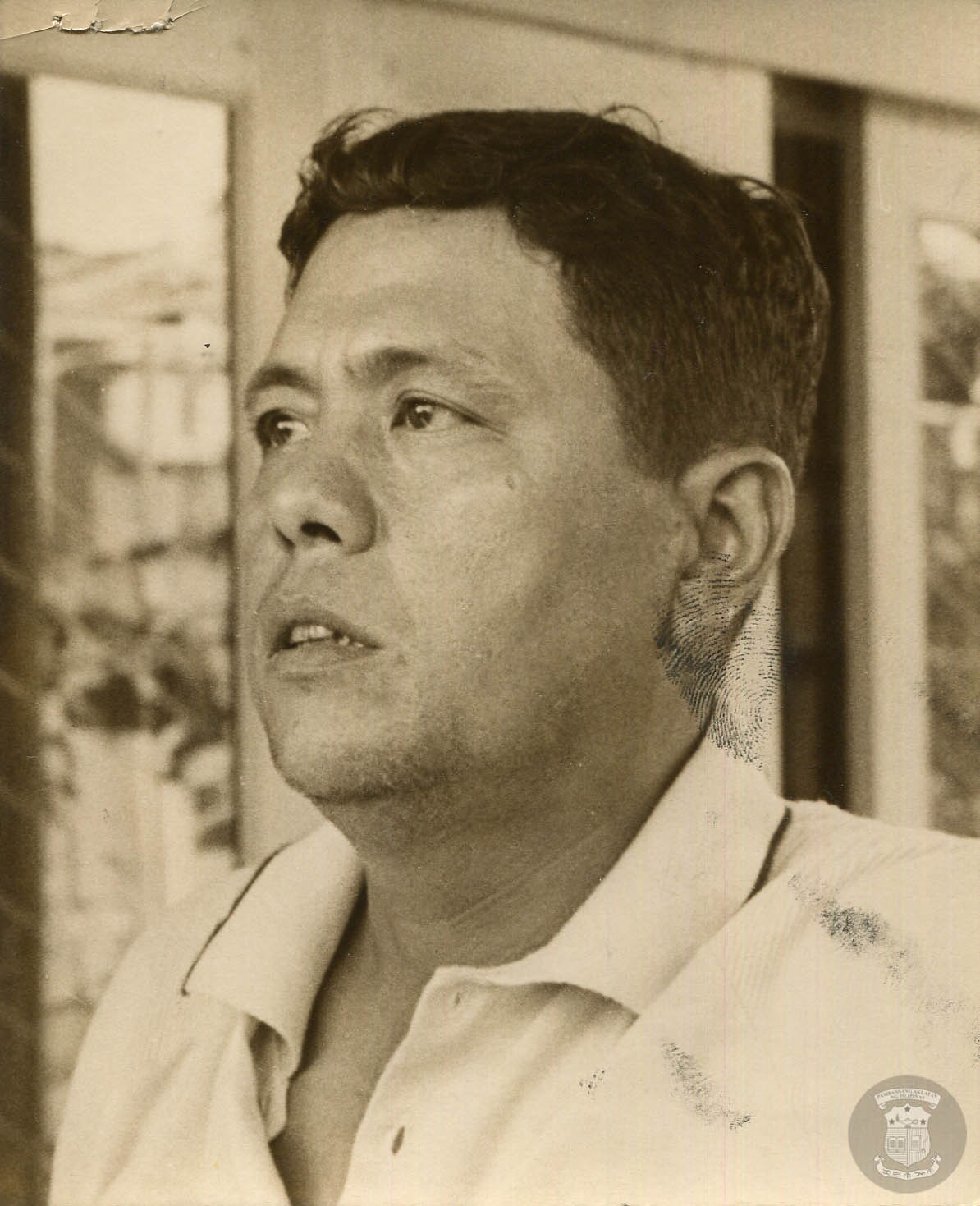
Sen. Jose W. Diokno founded the first united opposition in the Justice for Aquino, Justice for All coalition after the assassination.

On Sunday, August 21, 1983, opposition leader and former Philippine senator Benigno "Ninoy" Aquino Jr., a former Philippine senator was assassinated on the tarmac of Manila International Airport. This served as a flashpoint which transformed the Philippine opposition from a small isolated movement to a massive unified crusade, incorporating people from all walks of life. The first coalition formed was the Justice for Aquino, Justice for All, a creation of the Kilusan sa Kapangyarihan at Karapatan ng Bayan (Movement for People's Sovereignty and Democracy) or KAAKBAY. Multiple organizations joined, until it led to an "alphabet soup" of member organizations which culminated in Kongreso ng Mamamayang Pilipino (KOMPIL) or the Congress of the Filipino People that selected a candidate to run against Marcos. The middle class got involved, the impoverished majority participated, and business leaders whom Marcos had irked during martial law endorsed the campaign—all with the crucial support of the military and the Catholic Church hierarchy. The event also attracted worldwide media attention and Marcos's American contacts, and even Marcos' base of support within the Reagan administration began distancing itself from Marcos. The assassination also thrust Aquino's widow, Corazon, into the public eye. She was the presidential candidate of UNIDO opposition party in the 1986 snap election, running against Marcos and setting the stage for the later People Power Revolution.

== Aftermath of the Aquino assassination ==
While the Sacred Heart novitiate raid, the Macli-ing Dulag assassination, and the controversial 1978 and 1981 elections are recognized for being inciting incidents for the early dissent against Marcos from the ranks of the upper and middle class, it was the Ninoy Aquino assassination which is acknowledged for convincing the mainstream of Filipino society to speak against Marcos. Historian Maria Serena Diokno notes:

"It was the Aquino assassination, more than any other event in the Marcos regime's long history of repression and violence, which moved countless Filipinos, especially the once timid middle class, to awaken and jointly fight the reality of dictatorship. For many years, it was, in the words of a Makati Businessman, "... the spark that gave us the courage to speak up." Indeed, from that shocking moment on the tarmac in August 1983 until the EDSA revolution in February 1986, numerous organizations emerged to protest the iron strength of the Marcos dictatorship."

=== Aquino funeral procession ===
Philippine mainstream society, which had largely been unable to protest under Martial Law, erupted into protests after the Aquino assassination, beginning with Aquino's funeral procession in Manila. Following a 9:00 AM Mass officiated by Cardinal Sin, Aquino's remains were brought to Manila Memorial Park in Parañaque. The flatbed truck that served as Aquino's hearse wound through Metro Manila for 12 hours, finally reaching the memorial park at around 9 p.m. An estimated 2 million people lined the streets for the procession, but most media outlets did not dare to cover it. Some of the church-sponsored stations Radio Veritas and DZRH were the only ones to cover the entire ceremony.

=== Constant rallies ===
After the assassination, protest rallies against the Marcos regime became an almost weekly occurrence. Historian Mark Thompson notes that according to government estimates of protests in the wake of Aquino's murder:

“165 rallies, marches, and other demonstrations took place between August 21 and September 30, 1983... Protest demonstrations continued into the following year, with more than 100 held between October 1983 and February 1984."

This ran across all of the Philippines' socioeconomic strata, but a noticeable presence was the Philippines middle-class and sympathetic elite, which had previously avoided such protests. Ayala Avenue and the area now known as the Makati Central Business District became a common venue for such protests with protestors bringing festival drums to bring a musical element to the protests, and office workers from the buildings above showering the protesters with Yellow Confetti - the color which had become associated with Ninoy Aquino.

=== 1984 Welcome Rotonda protest dispersal ===
One of the most notable of the many rallies that took place between the August 21 assassination of Ninoy Aquino was the Welcome Rotonda protest dispersal of September 27, 1984, in which pro-Marcos forces hosed down and fired tear gas on several thousand peaceful protesters gathered at Welcome Rotonda, a roundabout on the border between the City of Manila and Quezon City.

They also fired into the crowd, which included 80-year-old former Senator Lorenzo Tañada and 71-year old Manila Times founder Chino Roces. Then-student leader Fidel Nemenzo was shot in the back, receiving injuries in his liver, diaphragm and lungs.

Images of the event showing the two seniors struggling against the waterhosing and teargas unleashed by the pro-Marcos forces were published in Mosquito press publications such as Malaya and WE Forum. These quickly became iconic, and led to a further decline in support for the already unpopular Ferdinand Marcos.

== Role in the People Power Revolution ==
The "middle forces" of opposition to Marcos played a prominent part in the People Power Revolution which finally ousted Marcos, heightened by the fact that the organizations associated with the organized left had decided to boycott the 1986 Snap elections, while the rightwing forces of the Reform the Armed Forces Movement's main contribution had been its failed coup and later pleas for help. At the same time, the various religious, business sector, professional, and social democrat groups which were angered by revelations of cheating during the elections were already organizing themselves to stage massive protests in the weeks before the revolution was sparked.

=== Civil disobedience campaign ===
The first major post-election demonstration of these middle forces was Aquino's "Tagumpay ng Bayan" (People's Victory) rally at Luneta Park on February 16, 1986, in which she invited a crowd of about two million people to participate in a civil disobedience campaign and a boycott of publications and companies which were associated with Marcos or any of his cronies. A week later when the revolution began in earnest, Aquino had been at a similar rally in Cebu when she learned about the events taking place at EDSA.

=== Protecting Aguinaldo and Crame ===
By the time Juan Ponce Enrile and the Reform the Armed Forces Movement decided to launch their coup plot in February 1986, the various religious, business sector, professional, and social democrat groups which were angered by revelations of cheating during the elections were already organizing themselves to stage massive protests. Corazon Aquino had already had a major rally in Luneta on February 16, and was in Cebu to drum up further support. So when the Enrile coup plot failed, the middle forces were already organized and ready to launch large demonstrations. Ninoy Aquino's brother Butz Aquino, along with some members of the August Twenty One Movement were early participants in the effort to keep Marcos from wiping out the RAM forces in Camp Aguinaldo and the forces of Fidel Ramos in Camp Crame which had rallied to support the RAM rebels. This was further enhanced when Cardinal Jaime Sin went on air on Radio Veritas to ask people to come to the stretch of EDSA between the camps, forming a human barricade to keep Marcos' loyalist troops from firing their weapons. Enrile famously noted that while the military was supposed to be the protectors of the people, the people had suddenly come out in opposition to Marcos, as protectors of their soldiers.

=== Establishing a civilian victory ===
The dominance of this middle force was made even more evident when Juan Ponce Enrile sought to solidify the RAM's claim on credit for the events of EDSA, by inviting Aquino to be inaugurated at Camp Crame. Aquino adamantly refused, emphasizing that the People Power Revolution was a civilian victory, not by a rebel military faction. Aquino held her inauguration on February 25, 1986, at Club Filipino instead, with Enrile and Ramos invited only as guests.

== Notable figures and organizations ==
- Jaime Sin
- Mary Christine Tan
- Macli-ing Dulag
- Jovito Salonga
- Raul Manglapus
- Lorenzo Tañada
- Jose W. Diokno
- Chino Roces
- Gaston Z. Ortigas
- Cesar Climaco
- Jose B. Lingad
- Bonifacio Gillego
- Butz Aquino
- Geny Lopez
- Alfonso Yuchengco
- Joe Burgos
- Eugenia Apostol
- Letty Jimenez Magsanoc
- Betty Go-Belmonte
- David Bueno
- James Reuter
- June Keithley
- Isabelo Magalit
- Melba Padilla Maggay
- Gilda Cordero Fernando
- APO Hiking Society
- Radio Veritas
- WE Forum
- Ang Pahayagang Malaya
- Makati Business Club
- Center for Research and Communication
- Catholic Bishops' Conference of the Philippines
- Task Force Detainees of the Philippines

== See also ==
- Bantayog ng mga Bayani
- Rightwing opposition to the Marcos dictatorship
