= Anti-authoritarianism =

Opposition to authoritarianism

Anti-authoritarianism is opposition to authoritarianism. Anti-authoritarians usually believe in full equality before the law and strong civil liberties. The term is sometimes used interchangeably with anarchism, an ideology which entails opposing authority or hierarchical organization in the conduct of human relations, including the state system.

== Philosophy ==
=== Analytic philosophy ===
Analytic philosophy positions the reader in a position where they can reject any philosophical argument made by the author, in contrast with other forms of philosophy that require the deference of the reader to the author. When the analytic reader feels they have a good reason to disagree with an author, they are entitled to regard the author as mistaken, rather than assuming themselves to be mistaken. Analytic philosophy applies this form of anti-authoritarianism to every reader and every author, regardless of their own philosophies or levels of education. Rather than allowing the reader to disagree without reason, analytic philosophy also applies the principle of charity, in which the reader reconstructs a philosophical argument to be in its strongest form before engaging in criticism of it. This principle requires that the author is not treated as an authority, as if they were treated as such, their words would not require a charitable interpretation.

=== Anarchism ===
Etymologically, anarchism is defined as a belief that society should not be ruled. The political philosophy of anarchism rejects forms of authority and hierarchy, including government and the state. According to the American academic John C. Clark, anarchism sees liberty as inherent to human nature and maintains an anti-authoritarian critique of existing institutions, seeking to establish a non-coercive or non-authoritarian society in their place. Anarchists seek to abolish the state and establish a stateless society, although they see the state as only one form of unjustifiable authority. Anarchism goes further to view authority as lacking in moral legitimacy, and something that should be overthrown if necessary. Anarchists see anti-authoritarianism as bound together with moral responsibility and personal development and believe that the overthrow of authorities can give way to a spontaneous order.

The French anarchist Pierre-Joseph Proudhon summed up the revolutionary goal of anarchism to be "no more authority", while Sébastien Faure claimed everyone who fights against authority to be an anarchist. Fundamentalist definitions of anarchism assert that it is synonymous with anti-authoritarianism, with the Italian anarchist Errico Malatesta defining anarchy as a "society organised without authority". Drawing from the ideas of Post-Marxism and the post-structuralism of Michel Foucault, post-anarchists such as Saul Newman have extended the rejection of authority to the rejection of repressive forms of power and hierarchy.

Although all anarchists are highly sceptical of authority, many do not outright reject all forms of authority and see some forms as legitimate, albeit still subject to questioning. The Russian anarchist Mikhail Bakunin acknowledged that he rejected specific kinds of authority, but insisted that his idea of anarchism was not opposed to all authority. Bakunin and his successor Peter Kropotkin were suspicious of all political authority over society, but accepted the methodological authority of science. Bakunin considered science to be the "sole legitimate authority", due to its basis in rationality and its concordance with human freedom. However, he also rejected the authority of individual scientific experts over aspects of social life. According to philosopher Richard T. De George, parental authority is also necessary in cases where parents must make choices that their child is not capable of making, although these choices should ideally not be imposed on the child without their consent. Through the anarchist lens, the legitimacy of parental authority is subject to the parents' conduct, the child's incapacity and whether it is necessary to exercise such authority.

Marxist and liberal critiques of anarchism have defined it synonymously with a strict anti-authoritarianism, which calls for the abolition of all forms of authority, and have thus dismissed it as "utopian". In the 1872 essay On Authority, Friedrich Engels condemned anarchist anti-authoritarianism and presented a justification for the authority of a technocracy. The American Marxist Hal Draper also criticised the anti-authoritarianism of individualist anarchism for basing its idea of freedom on a solipsistic idea of a sovereign individual, over whom individualist anarchists seek to abolish any higher authority.

=== Pragmatism ===
Pragmatist anti-authoritarians are motivated to construct a better future for humanity through fraternal cooperation, rather than relying on regulation by an external authority figure. According to pragmatism, anti-authoritarian ethics are developed through cultural inheritance, rather than the morality of a non-human higher power; and an anti-authoritarian epistemology prioritises intersubjectivity (the development of collective consensus through free inquiry) over the supposed objectivity of a higher power.

The American pragmatist philosopher John Dewey developed an anti-authoritarian philosophy in reaction against his own religious education. Dewey held that humans should regulate themselves through democratic cooperation with others, rather than through their desire to act in accordance with the will of some non-human higher power. He saw history as a process of ever-increasing freedoms and cooperation, and believed that authority ought to be replaced with fraternity. Through this lens, Dewey considered modern technology and liberal democracy to be two core aspects of movement towards an anti-authoritarian society, as they were both established through fraternal cooperation rather than paternalism. To Dewey, pragmatism rejects any authority other than that established by consensus. Dewey saw anti-authoritarianism as the replacement of a morality formed through obligation with one formed through love.

== Personality traits ==
In the Weimar Republic during the 1920s, German sociologist Erich Fromm began investigating the characteristics of authoritarian and anti-authoritarian sentiments, conducting a survey of German industrial workers which developed his theory on authoritarian personalities. By the 1930s, Fromm's Frankfurt School developed an interest in resistance to authority; at the time, they considered this through the lens of revolutionary politics, but their terminology later began to refer to the subject as anti-authoritarianism.

In the 1950 book The Authoritarian Personality, Theodor W. Adorno carried out a study of the characteristics of anti-authoritarians. Adorno and his colleagues found anti-authoritarian "low-scorers" to be opposed to hierarchy, injustice, autocracy and totalitarianism, and more likely than authoritarian "high-scorers" to resist social authorities who they perceived to uphold injustice. They categorised anti-authoritarians into five broad types: the "genuine liberal", who displayed a strong sense of autonomy, a capacity for critical thinking and a moral courage that led them to resist perceived injustice; the "rigid low-scorers", who had a dogmatic and superficial understanding of left-wing politics; the "protesting low-scorers", who rarely took action in accordance with their anti-authoritarian ideas due to their own psychological problems; the "impulsive low-scorers", who were unable to maintain a stable political ideology; and the "easygoing low-scorers", who rarely displayed a political ideology and preferred to focus on improving their individual situation rather than participating in social action.

Following the publication of Adorno's book, the term "anti-authoritarianism" gained more widespread usage among psychologists and sociologists, with Benjamin Spock using it to describe a laissez-faire approach to parenting. A 1972 study by Australian psychologists J. Martin and J. Ray found that agreement with anti-authoritarian statements was negatively correlated with the responders' socioeconomic status and positively correlated with indicators of neuroticism. A 1991 study by South African psychologist Jose Meloen found: that anti-authoritarians to be nine times more likely than authoritarians to engage in activism; that the more anti-authoritarian a person or group was, the more likely they were to engage in resistance activities; and that higher levels of education correlated with higher degrees of anti-authoritarianism. Meloen also found that, although authoritarians sometimes engaged in anti-authoritarian behaviour, such behaviour was not consistent and often isolated to individual situations.

== Historical movements ==
After World War II, there was a strong sense of anti-authoritarianism based on anti-fascism in Europe. This was attributed to the active resistance from occupation and to fears arising from the development of superpowers. Anti-authoritarianism has also been associated with countercultural and bohemian movements. In the 1950s, the Beat Generation were politically radical and to some degree their anti-authoritarian attitudes were taken up by activists in the 1960s. Opposition to United States involvement in the Vietnam War was largely led by anti-authoritarians, who participated in anti-war protests and engaged in conscientious objection.

Following the handover of Hong Kong in 1997, an anti-authoritarian movement grew in response to the increasing power of the government of China over the region. The movement culminated in the 2019–2020 Hong Kong protests against a proposed extradition bill, which eventually forced the bill to be withdrawn.

== See also ==
- Anarchist communism
- Anticonformism
- Autonomen
- Civil libertarianism
- Criticism of communist states
- Criticism of fascism
- Criticism of monarchy
- Democracy indices
- Fascist (insult)
- Freedom of speech
- Freedom
- Individualism
- Left-libertarianism
- Libertarian socialism
- Libertarianism
- Liberty
- List of freedom indices
- Middle force opposition to the Marcos dictatorship
- Opposition to Francoism
- Punk ideologies
- Question authority
- Social anarchism
- Social liberalism

== Bibliography ==
- Cantoni, Davide; Heizlsperger, Louis-Jonas; Yang, David Y.; Yuchtman, Noam; Zhang, Y. Jane (2022). "The fundamental determinants of protest participation: Evidence from Hong Kong's antiauthoritarian movement". Journal of Public Economics. 211 104667: 1–10. doi:10.1016/j.jpubeco.2022.104667. ISSN 0047-2727.
- Futter, Dylan B. (2016). "Philosophical Anti-authoritarianism". Philosophia. 44 (4): 1333–1349. doi:10.1007/s11406-016-9781-0.
- Gutherz, David (2019). "On Not Getting What You Want: Elvio Fachinelli's Anti-Authoritarianism". Psychoanalysis and History. 21 (3): 267–291. doi:10.3366/pah.2019.0307.
- Martin, J.; Ray, J. (1972). "Anti-authoritarianism: An indicator of pathology". Australian Journal of Psychology. 24 (1): 13–18. doi:10.1080/00049537208255780.
- McLaughlin, Paul (2007). Anarchism and Authority: A Philosophical Introduction to Classical Anarchism. Aldershot: Ashgate Publishing. ISBN 978-0-7546-6196-2. LCCN 2007007973.
- Meloen, Jos (1991). "Anti-authoritarianism and political activism". South African Journal of Psychology. 21 (4): 261–266. doi:10.1177/008124639102100410.
- Newman, Saul (2001). From Bakunin to Lacan: Anti-authoritarianism and the Dislocation of Power. Lexington Books. ISBN 0-7391-0240-0.
- Orenstein, David M.; Luken, Paul C. (1978). "Anarchistic Methodology: Methodological Anti-Authoritarianism as a Resolution to Paradigmatic Disputes in the Social Sciences". Sociological Focus. 11 (1): 53–68. doi:10.1080/00380237.1978.10570308.
- Rorty, Richard (2021). Pragmatism as Anti-authoritarianism. Harvard University Press. ISBN 9780674270060.
- Witoszek, Nina (2019). The Origins of Anti-Authoritarianism. Taylor & Francis. doi:10.4324/9781315164540. hdl:20.500.12657/76411. ISBN 9781315164540.
