= Ramon Alcaraz =

Philippine World War II hero

Ramon A. Alcaraz
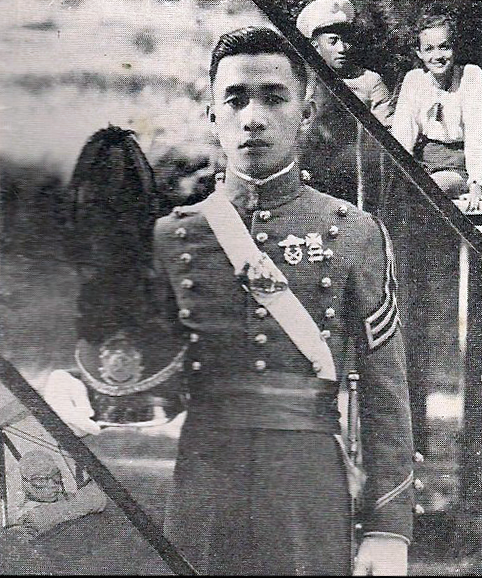
- Philippine Military Academy photo - Class of 1940
- Born: Ramon Abacan Alcaraz; 31 August 1915; Quingua, Bulacan, Philippine Islands
- Died: 25 June 2009 (aged 93); Santa Ana, California, U.S.
- Burial place: Fairhaven Memorial Park, Santa Ana, California, U.S.
- Military career
- Allegiance: Philippines
- Branch: Philippine Navy
- Service years: 1940–1941 (Army); 1941–1946 (USAFFE); 1946–1966 (Navy)
- Rank: Commodore (Navy); Captain (USAFFE)
- Nicknames: Monching, Parron
- Units: Offshore Patrol – (USAFFE); Philippine Naval Patrol (Navy)
- Commands: Philippine Naval Operating Force; Philippine Naval Fleet
- Conflicts: World War II; Battle of Bataan
- Awards: Silver Star (USA)

Commodore Ramon Abacan Alcaraz (31 August 1915 – 25 June 2009) was a Filipino World War II hero, Naval officer, and businessman best known as a recipient of the Silver Star for heroism and gallantry as part of the Offshore Patrol unit of the U.S. Army Forces in the Far East (USAFFE) during the Second World War; and as one of the earliest critics of the Marcos dictatorship within the Armed Forces of the Philippines.

After graduating as a member of the Philippine Military Academy's Pioneer class of 1940, he joined the USAFFE's Offshore Patrol (which would eventually become of the Philippine Navy) and was given command of the motor torpedo boat Q-112 Abra. In command of the Abra, he earned a Silver Star for an engagement on 17 January 1942, where the Abra shot down three low-flying Japanese planes which were attacking US and Filipino forces holed up in Bataan. He also held significant naval commands during the Korean War, including being squadron skipper of one of the teems that regularly transported the Battalion Combat Teams of the Philippine Expeditionary Force to Korea (PEFTOK) to wherever they needed to go.

Less than a month after Ferdinand Marcos first became President of the Philippines, Alcaraz, who was then in command of the Naval Operations Force against Smuggling, received instructions to go easy on smuggling operations in Cavite province, which Alcaraz refused on moral grounds. This led to conflict between Marcos and Alcaraz, who was pressured to leave the Navy as a result. Alcaraz denounced Marcos and the administration's defense policy, and then used a session of the House Defense Committee to lambast Marcos and retire early from his post as a means of protest. He and his wife established the Commodore Drug pharmacy chain, and continued to be prominent Marcos Critics as private citizens.

He was one of the many who were arrested and interrogated upon the declaration of Martial Law, but could not be held for long because of his popularity among the Armed Forces. Realizing from the interrogation that Marcos had been spying on him for years, he fled to the US as soon as he got out, through the intervention of his children who were American citizens. In the U.S., he quickly established himself in the real estate business, and became a member of the Movement for a Free Philippines as a financier, military adviser, and regular protester. During this time he worked extensively with Raul Manglapus, Bonifacio Gillego, and Ninoy Aquino, and was one of the last people Aquino met in the US before his assassination upon returning to the Philippines.

Overjoyed after the Marcoses were ousted by the civilian-led People Power Revolution in 1986, Alcaraz then shifted his focus and lobbied for the recognition of Filipino World War 2 veterans by the US legislature, and on pushing students and alumni of the Philippine Military Academy to respect the democratic values restored by the Fifth Philippine Republic after Marcos.

In 2013 the Philippine Navy named the frigate BRP Ramon Alcaraz (PF-16) in his honor – the first Philippine Navy ship to be named after a naval hero. In 2024 his name was inscribed at wall of remembrance of the Philippines' Bantayog ng mga Bayani memorial, which honors the martyrs and heroes who resisted the authoritarian regime of Ferdinand Marcos during the Philippines' Martial Law period.

== Early life and education ==
Alcaraz was born on 31 August 1915, in Parulan, a barrio in what was then the town of Quingua, Bulacan in the Central Luzon region of the Philippines. He was the older of two sons of Domingo Lipana Alcaraz and Maxima Cruz Abacan. His brother Marciano 'Rocky' retired as a captain of the Philippine Navy. He also had many sisters including Fe, Jacoba, Efigenia, and Lucila.

He entered the Philippine Military Academy at Teachers Camp, Baguio, Mountain Province, Philippines from 15 June 1936, to 15 March 1940, where he graduated with a Bachelor of Science degree. Alcaraz graduated among the 79 members (originally 120 cadets) of the Class of 1940 "The Pioneer Class". His class was the first group of graduates to finish the four year curriculum, as the previous curriculum was only three years. Alcaraz was a writer for the PMA publication "Corps" and the bantam weight boxing champion in 1937 and 1938.

In 1941, he voluntarily joined and graduated from the Army's newly formed Offshore Patrol (OSP) Training School in Manila as part of the USAFFE forces. In 1959, he went to United States to study at the Naval War College – Command Course at Newport, Rhode Island.

== Military career ==
=== World War II ===
After graduation, he assigned as a 3rd Lieutenant to the Philippine Commonwealth Army. Nineteen months later, he volunteered to the newly formed Offshore Patrol unit of the Army and promoted as a 2nd Lieutenant with the OSP – Sea duty forces. A few weeks after the Japanese attack on Pearl Harbor, he was promoted as a 1st Lieutenant after he was inducted into the U.S. Army Forces in the Far East (USAFFE). He was the Commanding Officer of the Q-112 Abra, a 55 ft stepped-hull torpedo boat with aftward launch torpedo chutes built for the Philippine Commonwealth Government by the British shipbuilding firm John I. Thornycroft & Company – one of three "Q-boat" torpedo boats used by the Offshore Patrol (OSP) during the war.

On 17 January 1942, while on patrol along the east coast of Bataan in Manila Bay with Q-111 Luzon, they were spotted by nine Japanese dive bombers that was travelling towards the Bataan coastline. The two torpedo boats turned to engage the Japanese enemy aircraft at full speed, and laying down accurate machine gun fire to shoot down three of the nine aircraft. Their attack was successful that it forced the remaining damaged Japanese planes to return to their base, thus preventing them to complete their bombing mission on Bataan installations. For their actions, he was immediately promoted to Captain by General MacArthur in Corregidor and awarded the Silver Star for heroism and gallantry in action.

On 10 April 1942, to prevent their boat capture by the Japanese, Captain Alcaraz's Q-112 Abra was scuttled at night near the shore of Paombong coast, four miles off Bataan's east coast. He and his crew floated to shore using bamboo poles but were spotted by two search lights from Japanese patrol boats.

They were subsequently incarcerated in Malolos, Bulacan POW Camp. Alcaraz was shortly appointed as Head among the POW prisoners, and took care of his fellow POWs in that capacity but was likewise held accountable for any escape. Alcaraz immediately used the sense of humor. Despite his disheartened state, Alcaraz befriended the Japanese and often flattered his enemy's ego by asking the Japanese to recount their battle victories. When new prisoners arrived with their hands tightly bound behind their back, Alcaraz would have Japanese soldiers untie them. Alcaraz felt responsible for keeping his fellow POWs alive and make their lives better the best way he could. It was during the many story-telling hours that his men enjoyed a respite from hard labor by just sitting and pretending to listen to the Japanese soldier's stories. At fall-in formations and other ceremonies, where POWs were required to hail "Banzai." Alcaraz would join in with his boisterous native version of "Bankay" (corpse), and the Japanese would roar with approval. By then, Alcaraz humor had become part and parcel of his escape plan, resulted in a less tortuous POW experience for his comrades compared with the unspeakable experiences the POWs endured at Camp O’Donnell. Notably, not a single death was registered at the Malolos POW camp.

Alcaraz was released on 10 August 1942, after undergoing an intensive four-month "rejuvenation program". He was paroled and instructed to be re-trained to join the Bureau of Constabulary at the Torres High School in Gagalangin, Tondo. In September 1942, he graduated as a police officer and was told that his first assignment was at Lanao del Norte province in Mindanao. Alcaraz faked that he had malaria and was confined to a hospital in San Lazaro. This ensured that he would miss his transport ship to Mindanao, so he was then reassigned to Bayombong, Nueva Vizcaya.

After the end of the war and of his ordeal as a POW, Alcaraz rejoined the OSP. After the Philippines was given its independence from United States, all remaining OSP officers became the pioneering nucleus of the organizational structure of the Philippine Naval Patrol which later renamed into the Philippine Navy.

=== Korean War service ===
As Lieutenant (Senior Grade) and later Commander, Alcaraz also held significant naval commands during the Korean War, including being squadron skipper of one of the teems that regularly transported the Battalion Combat Teams of the Philippine Expeditionary Force to Korea (PEFTOK) to wherever they needed to go.

=== Establishment of the Philippine Marine Corps ===
The Philippine Navy needed a combat fighting element, since the Navy's organizational structure and naval doctrine is modelled after the US Navy, their combat element would be modelled after the United States Marine Corps.

In 1950, then-Defense Secretary Ramon Magsaysay ordered Alcaraz to go to the United States to study the organization of the U.S. Marines. Upon his return, he applied the things he learned to a recommendation to create a naval infantry force under the command of the Philippine Navy, and thus earned the distinction of being the "Father" of the Philippine Marine Corps.

He designated veteran naval officer, his former Q-Boat (Q-112) executive officer, LTSG.(Senior Grade) Manuel A. Gomez (PMA Class 41), to form and lead the First Marine Battalion based at Naval Base Cavite, Cavite City. On Nov.02, 1950, LTSG Manuel Gomez became the first commanding officer and commandant of the Philippine Marine Corps.

=== Command of the Naval Operations Force against Smuggling ===
In 1964 president Diosdado Macapagal placed Alcaraz in command of the Naval Operations Force (NOF) he had created to combat smuggling, particularly of foreign cigarettes. In the years immediately following World War II, traders in the Mindanao had begun smuggling foreign cigarettes from places like Borneo. But by the 1950s and 60s, these trade deals had been usurped by the network created by "smuggler king" Lino Bocolan of Tanza Cavite, who turned cigarette smuggling into a massively profitable racket.

After some initial frustrations, Alcaraz proved highly effective at the job, seizing about P750,000 worth of smuggled cigarettes each month in 1965 and getting him promoted to the naval rank of Commodore.

== Conflict with President Ferdinand Marcos and separation from service ==
=== Conflict with Marcos ===
Alcaraz was still in command of the anti-smuggling operations force in 1965 when the Philippine Presidential Elections of 1965 took place. During the campaign early in that year, President Macapagal was accused of allowing smuggling to continue by his opponent Ferdinand E. Marcos. Macapagal attempted to defuse these accusations by appointing Marcos as an "antismuggling czar," placing Alcaraz' command under Marcos' influence. Marcos then won the election in November that year, becoming Commander in Chief of the Armed Forces upon his inauguration on 30 December 1965.

The rise of Ferdinand Marcos soon placed Alcaraz in conflict with his own commander in chief. Historian Alfred W. McCoy recounts in his book "Closer than Brothers" that:

"Only days after his inauguration in December 1965, Marcos met secretly with smuggler-king [Lino] Bocalan and agreed to restrain the navy patrols for a share of the profits."

In a radio broadcast on 11 January 1966, Marcos included Alcaraz' name in a list of corrupt officials and relieved him of command. Alcaraz protested this action and in doing so, also criticized the government's National Defense policy.

=== Congressional vindication ===
Alcaraz was placed under investigation for his comments against Marcos, and Undersecretary for National Defense Ernesto Mata gave him an ultimatum, saying he had a choice between retiring and be demoted. In Alcaraz' reply to Mata, he said:

"You can reduce me to Apprentice Seaman… I don’t care. My father was a farmer, I can go back to being a farmer."

The Congressional Investigation eventually cleared Alcaraz of any wrongdoing, although Marcos continued to try to assert his power. Bulacan Representative Rogaciano Mercado, who was acquainted with Alcaraz, eventually began a congressional exposé on the matter, which Marcos was forced to back off.

=== Retirement in protest ===
Vindicated but still angry, Alcaraz chose a session of the House Defense Committee to once again criticize the national defense policy and announce his retirement. Alcaraz was applauded as he left the witness stand, and he would thereafter continue to be a staunch critic of Ferdinand Marcos' administration.

After 26 years of active service, Commodore Alcaraz was placed on the retired list from active duty on 22 January 1966.

Alcaraz had been forced to leave the service only 22 days after Marcos became president, making him the first of what would turn out to be many AFP officers forced out of the service in favor of those who were loyal to Marcos.

He and his wife, who happened to be a pharmacist, then established a chain of drugstores called "Commodore Drug," in reference to Alcaraz' rank upon retirement.

== 1969 Advocacy work ==
When the campaign period for the 1969 Philippine presidential election began, Philippine World War II hero Terry Adevoso organized a lobbying group of retired officers supporting opposition candidate Sergio Osmeña Jr.

Simply called the "Working Group," it called for "clean and honest elections" in light of what Time and Newsweek called the "dirtiest, most violent and most corrupt" election "in Philippine modern history," characterized by vote-buying, terrorism and ballot snatching. As a former flag officer, Alcaraz was invited to the group.

This once again earned Alcaraz the ire of the administration, which initiated a persecutory investigation of Alcaraz's real estate transactions in retaliation, eventually leading to the closure of Commodore Drug.

== Martial law detention and interrogation ==
When Marcos declared Martial Law in 1972, the chief of Presidential Security took particular attention on Commodore Alcaraz' protest and advocacy work. On 15 November 1972, the Commodore was brought to the PSG headquarters in Malacañang for interrogation.

The investigation was conducted by graduates of the Philippine Military Academy Class of 1971, in a manner which angered Alcaraz because it violated the PMA's code of conduct for the treatment of superior officers. Alcaraz would later express dismay about their breach of protocol, even long after the Marcoses had been removed from office.

Malacañang could not hold Alcaraz for long because he remained popular among the Armed Forces, upon whom Marcos depended as implementors of the martial law regime. As a result, Alcaraz was eventually released.

== Exile in California ==
During his interrogation in Malacañang, Alcaraz realized that Marcos's soldiers knew too much about the specifics of meetings of the Osmeña working group, and realized that the inner circle of the group must have had a spy.

As a result, Alcaraz decided that he had to escape from the Philippines. His children, who were American citizens born during his studying stint at the Naval War College in Rhode Island, facilitated his immigration petition, and he was quickly able to move to California.

In California, he quickly established himself in the real estate business, doing well enough that he could help finance organizations that lobbied for the end of Marcos' dictatorship in the Philippines.

== Movement for a Free Philippines ==
Alcaraz became a quiet but key member of the Movement for a Free Philippines in the West Coast, serving as a financier, military adviser, and regular protester.

During this time he worked behind the scenes with figures such as former Senator Raul Manglapus, former Constitutional Convention Delegate Boni Gillego, and opposition leader Ninoy Aquino.

Gillego, who was already working on an expose of Marcos' falsified war record and medals, sought Alcaraz' help in identifying and contacting veterans who could corroborate the details of Marcos' actual actions during the war.

In August 1983, Alcaraz was one of the last people Aquino interacted with prior to his assassination in the Philippines in August 1983. Aquino had asked to meet Alcaraz, exiled congressman Raul Daza, and the businessman Manuel Leelin at the Ambassador Hotel in Los Angeles to discuss his reasons and plans for returning to the Philippines.

== Advocacies after the People Power Revolution ==
After the Marcoses were ousted by the civilian-led People Power Revolution in 1986, Alcaraz shifted his focus and lobbied for the recognition of Filipino World War 2 veterans by the US legislature.

He also spoke often to cadets and alumni of the Philippine Military Academy, pushing cadets and alumni alike to respect the democratic values restored by the Fifth Philippine Republic after Marcos. He vigorously and publicly denounced those in the Armed Forces who had taken up military adventurism, saying that in abandoning the ideals of democracy, they had violated the academy's all-important honor code.

== Death ==
Alcaraz died at Orange county on 25 June 2009. He is buried in Fairhaven Memorial Park, Santa Ana, CA, U.S.A.

== Personal life ==
He was married to Concepcion 'Conching' Dualan from Cavite in 1960. They have one child. He has children from his first marriage — two sons and three daughters.

== Legacy ==
=== BRP Ramon Alcaraz (PS-16) ===
On 6 May 2012, Philippine President Benigno Aquino III announced that the country's second Gregorio del Pilar class frigate would be named the BRP Ramon Alcaraz (PF-16), in honor of Alcaraz' long service to the nation. Formerly known as the United States Coast Guard Cutter (USCGC) Dallas, the Ramon Alcaraz was formally transferred to the Philippine government on 22 May 2012 (23 May 2012 Philippine standard time) under the auspices of the United States Foreign Assistance Act, with ceremonies held at the Federal Law Enforcement Training Center Pier Papa in North Charleston, South Carolina.

BRP Ramon Alcaraz has changed ship reclassification types twice. Originally "PF-16" till mid of 2016 to "FF-16". In February 2019, redesignated again to "PS-16", as the Navy downgraded the entire frigate class to patrol ship status.

== See also ==
- Boni Gillego
- Military history of the Philippines during the Marcos dictatorship
