= Arturo M. Taca =

Filipino surgeon, writer, and activist (1954– 1997)

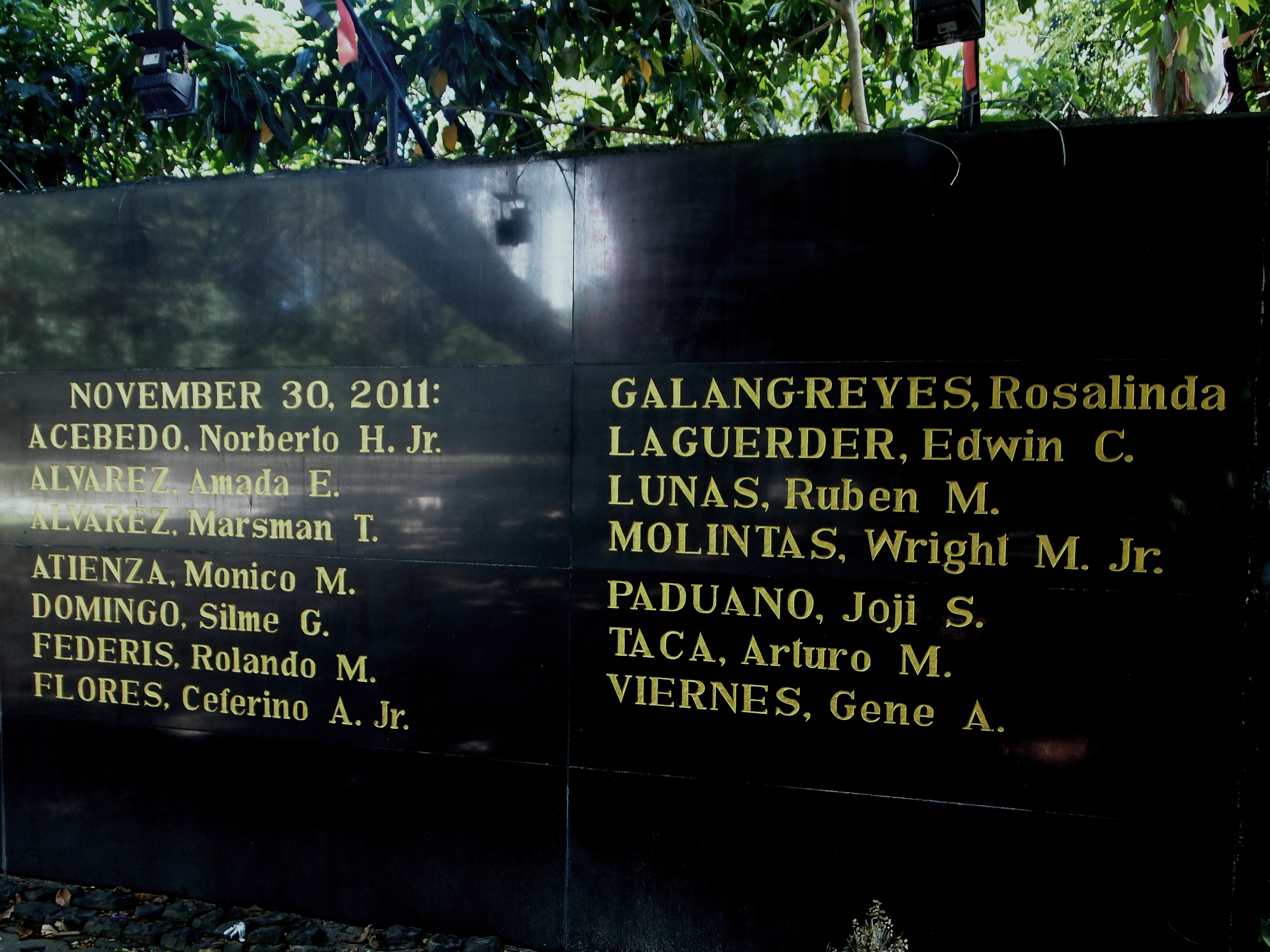
- Detail of the Wall of Remembrance at the Bantayog ng mga Bayani, showing names from the 2011 batch of Bantayog Honorees, including that of Taca.
- Born: Arturo Montemayor Taca; February 11, 1945; Manila, Philippines
- Died: February 11, 1997 (aged 52); St. Louis, Missouri
- Other name: Patur
- Education: University of Santo Tomas
- Occupations: Surgeon, Urologist

Arturo Montemayor Taca (February 11, 1945 – February 11, 1997) was a Missouri-based Filipino surgeon, urologist, writer, and activist best known as one of the leaders of the Movement for a Free Philippines (MFP), a US-based organization established by exiled Filipinos in opposition to the authoritarian regime of Ferdinand Marcos in the Philippines. He is honored as a hero of the fight for Philippine democracy, having his name inscribed on the Wall of Remembrance of the Philippines' Bantayog ng mga Bayani memorial in 2011.

== Life in the Philippines and exile ==
Already a doctor at the Ospital ng Maynila in the Philippines, Taca was forced to flee to the United States due to political persecution after Marcos' declaration of Martial Law in 1972, Taca immigrated to the US in 1973 and was granted asylum there in 1977. He passed both the Missouri and Illinois medical licensure examinations and opened a practice in both states and took up posts at the Homer G. Phillips Hospital in St. Louis, eventually joining its general surgery department and then in the urology departments.

== Movement for a Free Philippines ==
From there, he became the head of the St. Louis chapter of the Movement for a Free Philippines, which had been established by Raul Manglapus and Bonifacio Gillego in Washington, D.C. four years prior. Working with other MFP stalwarts such as Manglapus, Gillego, Heherson Alvarez, Serge Osmena, Raul Daza, and Steve Psinakis, Taca recruited like-minded Filipino expatriates, published a newsletter critical of the Marcos regime, and lobbied US Senators to call attention to the Marcos administration's human rights record.

== Role in the Marcos Medals expose ==
When Bonifacio Gillego asked Taca for help in confirming that Marcos had falsified his war records in order to falsely claim to be a World War II hero, Taca worked hard to help track down the necessary documents, resulting in a New York Times exposé on Marcos' fake war record, published in early 1986.

== Later years ==
During the last years of the Marcos administration in the Philippines, Taca became a regular fixture on US television, as an established voice of exiles opposed to the dictatorship. He also wrote for Life magazine, Washington Post, St. Louis Post Dispatch, the US-based Filipino Reporter, and Philippine News.

== Death and legacy ==
Taca developed lung problems linked to smoking, and died at home in St. Louis home on February 11, 1997, his 52nd birthday. In the Philippines, he is honored as a hero of the fight for the restoration of democracy, and his name was inscribed on the Wall of Remembrance of the Philippines' Bantayog ng mga Bayani memorial in 2011.
