= Jeanne Ballantine =

American academic

Jeanne H. Ballantine is Emerita Professor of Sociology at Wright State University in Ohio. She is also director of the Center for Teaching and Learning at Wright State. She was awarded the 1986 Hans O. Mauksch Award, by the American Sociological Association.

== Education and academic career ==
Ballantine received her bachelor's degree from Ohio State University in 1963, master's degree from Columbia University in 1966 and her Doctor of Philosophy from Indiana University Bloomington in 1971. She was involved in designing and implementing the master's program in Applied Behavioral Science at Wright State.

== Awards ==
- Hans O. Mauksch Award for Distinguished Contributions to Teaching of Sociology, American Sociological Association's Section on Undergraduate Education,1986
- Distinguished Contributions to Teaching Award, American Sociological Association, 2004
- J. Milton Yinger Award for Distinguished Career in Sociology, North Central Sociological Association, 2010

== Works ==
- Ballantine, Jeanne H.; Spade, Joan Z.; Stuber, Jenny M., eds. (2018). Schools and society: a sociological approach to education (Sixth ed.). Los Angeles: SAGE Publishing. ISBN 978-1-5063-4697-7.
- Ballantine, Jeanne H.; Stuber, Jenny M.; Everitt, Judson G. (2022). The sociology of education: a systematic analysis (Ninth ed.). New York London: Routledge, Taylor & Francis Group. ISBN 978-0-367-90315-2.
- Our social world : condensed : an introduction to sociology. SAGE. 2020. ISBN 9781544344416.
