= Movement for a Free Philippines =

US-based Philippine organization

Movement for a Free Philippines (often referred to by its acronym, MFP) was a Washington, D.C.–based organization established in 1973 by exiled Filipinos in opposition to the authoritarian regime of Ferdinand Marcos in the Philippines.

== Establishment and early engagements ==
The MFP became the most prominent of several US-based Philippine opposition groups, partly because its leaders were already established opposition figures before Marcos' declaration of Martial Law in 1972; and partly because it espoused "moderate" views aimed at the return of the Philippines' pre-Marcos democratic norms, as opposed to the more "progressive" views of other groups such as the Katipunan ng Demokratikong Pilipino (KDP) which were further to the left of the political spectrum. It was thus notable for broadening the appeal of anti-dictatorship efforts among Filipinos in the US, and for managing to get significant coverage from American media and policymakers. Groups such as the Light-A-Fire Movement (LAFM) and the April 6 Liberation Movement (A6LM) also differed from the goals initially set out by the MFP in that they espoused armed actions against the Marcos administration, although several of the members of those organizations were allegedly originally members of the MFP.

The MFP was active through the Nixon, Ford, and Carter administrations, achieving varying levels of success depending on whether or not the administration in power chose to ally closely with Marcos. Regardless of the administration, however, US engagement against Marcos' excesses was not possible because US interests included maintaining numerous major military bases in the Philippines, which the US needed in order to project power in Asia.

== Boni Gillego's Marcos medals expose ==
A major contribution of the MFP came in 1982 when MFP member Bonifacio Gillego was able to publish an article titled “The Other Version of FM’s War Exploits” in the Manila-based WE Forum publication in November 1982. Drawing on the extensive research he was able to do in Washington DC as a member of the MFP, Gillego was able to reveal that Marcos had faked most of the World War II medals which he had used to build up popularity and support during the 1965 presidential elections.

== After the Aquino assassination ==
After the assassination of Senator Ninoy Aquino in August 1983, the activities of the MFP largely gave way to the broader advocacy represented by the Ninoy Aquino Movement (NAM) formed by MFP member Heherson Alvarez. With the Aquino assassination as a rallying cry, the NAM was able to appeal to a broader constituency as the combination of the Aquino Assassination, the 1983 Economic Nosedive, the expose of corruption by the Marcoses and their cronies, and pressure from human rights advocates and democracy watchdog organizations both internationally and in the Philippines led to the ousting of the Marcoses during the 1986 People Power Revolution.

== After the People Power revolution ==
Upon the establishment of the Fifth Philippine Republic, numerous members of the MFP became high ranking government officials, both in elected and appointed posts. Many of them were later honored upon their death, by having their names inscribed at the wall of remembrance of the Philippines' Bantayog ng mga Bayani, which honors the martyrs and heroes of the resistance against the Marcos dictatorship.

== Known members ==
The MFP never released an official list of its ordinary members due to safety concerns, its more prominent founding members included former Senator Raul Manglapus, Colonel Bonifacio Gillego, and Congressman Raul Daza. Other prominent personalities who joined MFP later – mostly after escaping from Marcos' stringent Martial Law Travel ban – were Commodore Ramon Alcaraz, Constitutional Convention delegate Heherson Alvarez, and political family scion Serge Osmeña.

== See also ==
- Martial law under Ferdinand Marcos
- People Power revolution
- Raul Manglapus
- Boni Gillego
- Heherson Alvarez
- Arturo Taca
