= Patrol torpedo boat Q-112 Abra =

Torpedo boat of the United States Navy

History

United States Army
- Name: Q-112 Abra
- Builder: John I. Thornycroft & Company, Southampton
- Laid down: 15 April 1938
- Launched: 1939
- Sponsored by: Commonwealth of the Philippines
- Home port: Manila
- Fate: scuttled, 9 April 1942

General characteristics
- Type: Motor torpedo boat
- Tonnage: 17 gross register tons
- Length: 16.8 m (55 ft 1 in) o/a
- Beam: 3.97 m (13 ft 0 in)
- Draught: 1.0 m (3 ft 3 in)
- Propulsion: 2 Thornycroft petrol engines, 2 shafts
- Speed: 40 knots
- Complement: 5
- Armament: 2 x .50 caliber machine guns, 2 x 21" torpedo tubes, 2 x Mark 14 torpedoes, 2 depth charges

Q-112 Abra was a motor torpedo boat of the United States Army during World War II as part of the Offshore Patrol based at Manila.

== History ==
In 1935, the Commonwealth Government passed the National Defense Act which was criticized because it did not include funding for a Commonwealth navy instead relying on the United States Asiatic Fleet. Determined to develop an indigenous naval defense, the government authorized the creation of its own naval patrol unit consisting of a squadron of three wooden-hull, fast patrol torpedo boats with the goal to reach 36 boats by 1946. To avoid overlap with the Asiatic Fleet, the unit was to be part of a new seagoing arm of the Philippine Army under the United States Army Forces in the Far East. On 9 February 1939, the Off Shore Patrol (OSP) was formed with its headquarters located at Muelle Del Codo, in the Port of Manila and was headed by U.S. Naval Academy graduate First Lieutenant Jose V. Andrada (namesake of the Jose Andrada-class patrol craft). The first two boats, the 55 foot Q-112 Abra and the 65 foot Q-111 Luzon were ordered simultaneously from the British builder John I. Thornycroft & Company of Southampton.

Q-112 was based on a standard Thornycroft design which had two torpedoes in stern troughs while Q-112 had had fixed deck torpedo tubes. She was laid down on 15 April 1938 and arrived in the Philippines in March 1939, ahead of Q-111. With the arrival of the locally made, 55-foot Q-113 Agusan, the squadron was complete with Q-111 serving as the squadron's flagship. The torpedo boats were based at Cavite Naval Base but berthed with maintenance facilities at Muele del Codo (Engineer Island) in the port area of Manila. In 1941, the squadron conducted joint maneuvers in Manila Bay with the 6 boats of Motor Torpedo Boat Squadron Three (PT-31, PT-32, PT-33, PT-34, PT-35, PT-41) commanded by Lt. John D. Bulkeley. On 4 December 1941, Enrique L. “Henry” Jurado, a 1934 graduate of the U.S. Naval Academy was put in charge of the squadron. After the Attack on Pearl Harbor, the squadron added two additional boats, converted launches that served as patrol boats, the Q-114 Danday (ex-Carmen, named after the wife of Jurado) and the Q-115 Baler (former tender of the presidential yacht BRP Banahaw (ex-Casiana, ex-Cassandra). The squadron patrolled the waters of the bay and protected the eastern shore of the Bataan Peninsula from Japanese infiltration. After Manila was declared an open city on 26 December 1941, the squadron operated out of Sisiman Cove , to the immediate east of Cavite and north of Corregidor where the American PT boats were also based. The squadron along with its American counterparts, were service by the submarine tender, Canopus which was moored at Cavite Naval Base. In addition to conducting patrols, Q-112 delivered food, ammunition, troops, and medicine to the beleaguered troops during the Battle of Bataan and Battle of Corregidor.

On 17 January 1942, Q-111 and Q-112 were patrolling off the east coast of Bataan when they were attacked by nine Japanese dive bombers. The Q-boats successfully evaded the bomb attack and were able to shoot down or severely damage three attacking aircraft with their machine guns. Two officers of the Q-112 were awarded Silver Stars: Lieutenant Ramon A. Alcaraz, Commanding Officer, and Lieutenant Gomez, Executive Officer. On 8 April 1942, after the fall of Bataan left the squadron without a safe port, it was decided to attempt to make an escape to Australia with the remaining 4 boats of the squadron (Danday had been bombed and destroyed on 2 February). Q-112 developed engine troubles and had to return where it was scuttled at Navotas on 9 April 1942. The remainder of the squadron was first intercepted by Japanese land-based Naval aircraft of the 1st Kōkūtai and were able to down one plane; and then by the Japanese destroyers Samidare and Murasame. The squadron attacked the destroyers with their torpedoes and machine gun fire but did not score any hits. Q-111 was hit and scuttled by its crew somewhere between Batangas and Cavite provinces on 9 April 1942. Q-113 and Q-115 returned to the safety of the bay where Q-113 was scuttled on 9 April 1942 to prevent Japanese capture. Q-115 was ultimately able to leave the bay with 23 passengers but was captured by the Japanese off Cabra Island. Lieutenant Alcaraz was captured by the Japanese and later became a guerrilla.
