= Offshore Patrol =

Naval warfare branch of the Philippine Army from 1939 to 1946

Off Shore Patrol
- Active: February 9, 1939 – June 30, 1946
- Country: Philippines
- Branch: United States Army Forces in the Far East
- Size: 60+ personnel 5 Q-boats
- Part of: United States Department of War (1941)
- Headquarters: Muelle del Codo, Port Area, Manila, Philippines
- Anniversaries: February 9, 1939
- Engagements: World War II * Battle of Bataan * Battle of Corregidor
- Decorations: Presidential Unit Citation (US) Presidential Unit Citation (PH)

Commanders
- Flag Officer in-Command: Col. Enrique L. Jurado (1941-1944)
- Ceremonial chief: Col. Jose V. Andrada (1945-1946)

The Offshore Patrol (OSP) also known as the Mosquito Fleet was a small naval branch of the United States Army, intended for inshore defense of the Commonwealth of the Philippines. It was active from February 9, 1939 to June 30, 1946. The OSP became part of the United States Army Forces in the Far East (USAFFE) on July 26, 1941, with General Douglas MacArthur as Commander. During the Japanese invasion of the Philippines, the Patrol engaged in limited naval operations along the coastlines of Bataan and Corregidor, against the tight enemy blockade, to bring much-needed provisions to the beleaguered Filipino and American troops during the battle. Undaunted by enemy superiority, the ubiquitous patrol boats fought with zeal, courage and heroism, hitting Japanese warships with torpedoes when given the opportunity. The unit relied on speed and surprise to attack larger vessels at close range.

During the course of the war, the unit was cited for gallantry by General MacArthur for actions against three of nine Japanese dive bombers going to attack shore installations in Bataan.

After World War II, the OSP continued until June 30, 1946, dissolving concurrently with the USAFFE in the lead-up to the Philippines's independence. The OSP was transformed into the Philippine Naval Patrol (PNP). This small unit was the first independent Philippine naval force that fully understood the doctrine of naval warfare. The OSP's veterans eventually became the nucleus that shaped the beginnings of the modern Philippine Navy.

== History ==
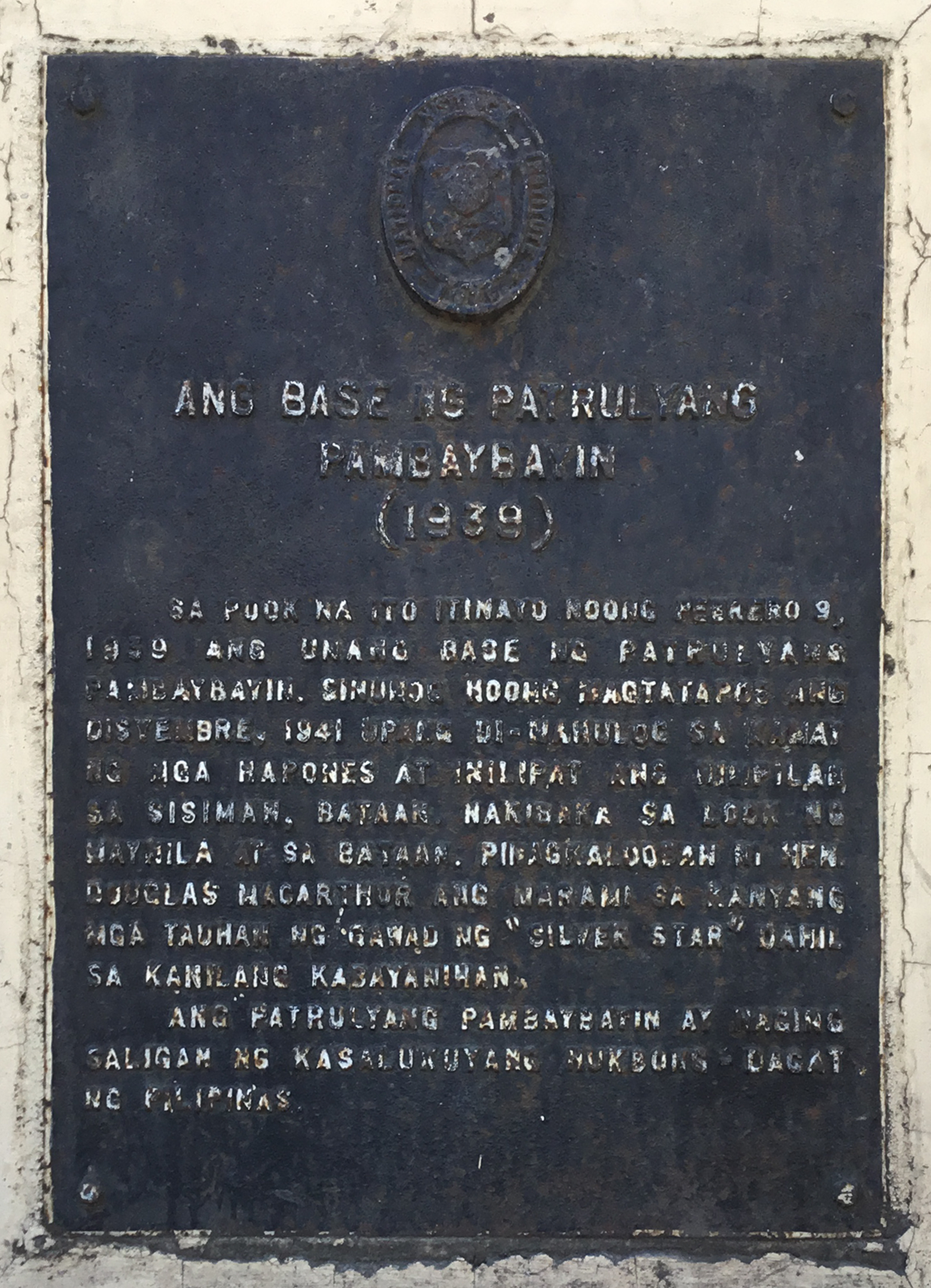
Historical marker unveiled in 1976 and located at the Port Area district of Manila

The OSP was called for by the Philippine National Assembly in its National Defense Act of 1935 that Offshore Patrol on 11 January 1936. Its guidelines were defined by Executive Order No. 11 as follows:

"The Off-Shore Patrol shall comprise all marine equipment and personnel acquired by the Philippine Government and assigned either in peace or war to the control of the Chief of Staff (PA). It shall have such duties and powers as may be described by the Chief of Staff, PA."

This act called for the creation, by 1946, of a force of thirty-six fast torpedo boats (PT) as part of the Philippine Army. These were to be British-designed torpedo boats, with a speed of forty-one knots; they were to be armed with two torpedo tubes and built by British shipbuilders. Only two of the boats were delivered by 1939, at which point the war in Europe curtailed any further supply. By October 1941, a third torpedo boat had been assembled locally. The squadron was attached to United States Army Forces in the Far East (USAFFE), which had assumed overall control of military forces in the Philippines; and added two additional patrol boats (non-torpedo).

The first commanding OSP officer was Major Rafael Ramos, a Philippine Nautical School (PNS) graduate known to Philippine President Manuel L. Quezon on April 15, 1938. Ramos was the first chief to start recruiting OSP personnel. In June 1938, he was relieved by Captain Jose V. Andrada, a United States Naval Academy graduate (Class of 1930), who originally assisted Ramos but was determined to be better qualified. Major Ramos was sent to the United States to study at Quartermaster School. He was supported by other Annapolis graduates, among them: Lt. Alfredo Pecson (USNA 1933) as Executive Officer, Lt. Rafael Pargas (USNA 1935), and Lt. Marcelo Castillo (USNA 1938). The OSP was later joined by Lt. Enrique L. Jurado (USNA 1934) as Base Commander, and Lt. Carlos Albert (USNA 1938) as instructors.

Shortly after his appointment, Capt. Andrada announced his volunteer recruiting program and began personally interviewing interested candidates. By the end of 1938, USNA graduates: Lt. Alfredo Peckson (1933), Lt. Marcelo Castillo (1938); PMA graduates: Lieutenants Nestor Reinoso (1934), Alberto Navarette (1935), Simeon Castro (1935), Juan Maglayan (1937), Alfonso Palencia (1938), Santiago Nuval (1938), Emilio Liwanag (1938), nine officers, and twenty-five enlisted men had joined the OSP. They were all trained on seamanship, navigation and gunnery in sessions that were conducted with the USNA graduates as instructors at OSP headquarters in Muelle del Codo, Port Area, Manila. On February 9, 1939, the first OSP class graduated; Capt. Andrada marked it as the birth date of the Offshore Patrol.

On December 4, 1941, Captain Enrique L. “Henry” Jurado (1911 – Oct. 19, 1944), a USNA graduate (Class of '34), became the officer-in-command of the OSP, just before the Pearl Harbor attack. Jurado took over as OSP Commander as Capt. Andrada became Commander of the Coast Artillery Battalion, Fort Wint, Corregidor.

The OSP was a close-knit unit composed of men in their late teens or twenties, more than sixty men overall. They were divided into two main groups: shore and sea duty.

== Offshore Patrol torpedo boat designs ==
The PT-boats of the Offshore Patrol were to be 65 ft long (20 m), with a 13-foot (4.0 m) beam. They were to have three 12-cylinder engines, and a speed of 41 knots (76 km/h; 47 mph). Their armament was to consist of two 21in (533 mm) torpedo, depth charges, and light antiaircraft guns.

US Military Advisor to the Commonwealth of the Philippines General Douglas MacArthur states, "A small fleet of such vessels will have distinct effect in compelling any hostile force to approach cautiously."

== Torpedo and patrol boats of the Offshore Patrol ==
The Offshore Patrol craft were berthed at "Muele del Codo" (Engineer Island) in Manila's Port Area. During the Japanese campaign against Bataan they operated out of Sisiman Bay. (Note: "Sisiman Cove" in U.S. Naval references of the time, but now geographically known as "Sisiman Bay" just to the east of Mariveles. 14.425485°N 120.526927°E) The American navy PT boats, Motor Torpedo Boat Squadron Three, under Lt. Bulkeley were also in the same bay but alongside the requisitioned tug Trabajador serving as a tender. The squadron consisted of five boats:

- 3 Torpedo boats
  - PT Q-111 Luzon - commanded by Captain Alberto Navarette
  - PT Q-112 Abra - Lieutenant Ramon A. Alcaraz
  - PT Q-113 Agusan - Lieutenant Santiago Nuval
- 2 Motor launches put into service at Bataan.
  - PB Q-114 Danday - Lieutenant Abraham Campo
  - PB Q-115 Baler - Lieutenant Carlos Albert

== See also ==
- Military History of the Philippines
- United States Asiatic Fleet
