= Enrique Jurado =

Filipino Army officer and wrestler

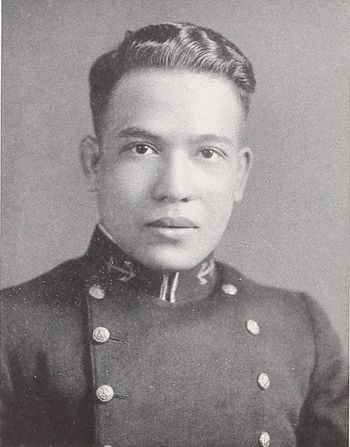

Personal information
- Born: Enrique Lopez Jurado; July 15, 1911 Lucena, Philippine Islands
- Died: October 14, 1944 (aged 33) Bongabong, Mindoro, Japanese-occupied Philippines

Sport
- Country: Philippines
- Sport: Wrestling
- Military career
- Allegiance: Philippines
- Branch: USAFFE
- Service years: 1936–1941 (Army); 1941–1944 (USAFFE)
- Rank: Captain (USAFFE)
- Nicknames: "Henry", "Hank"
- Unit: Offshore Patrol – (USAFFE)
- Commands: OSP Chief Commander; OSP Base Commander
- Conflicts: World War II; Battle of Bataan

Captain Enrique L. Jurado (July 15, 1911 – October 14, 1944) was an officer in the Philippine Army – Offshore Patrol during the Second World War. A graduate of the United States Naval Academy, Class of 1934, Foreign Midshipman who returned to the Philippines to teach at the Philippine Military Academy. Later joined its Army Coastal Defense force, the Offshore Patrol (OSP), as an instructor to its first class of graduates. He was the officer-in-command of the OSP, just before the Pearl Harbor attack on December 4, 1941. He led his squadron of three torpedo boats (Q-111 Luzon, Q-112 Abra, Q-113 Agusan) and two gunboats (Q-115 Baler and Q-114 Danday) in the Bataan defense campaign, and managed to escape the Japanese when he ordered his flagship to Batangas. After his escape and recovery, he joined the guerrillas in Panay. Jurado was sent to Mindoro to try to consolidate the guerrillas there, but was killed by a rival guerrilla faction.

== Early life and education ==
Jurado was born on July 15, 1911. He graduated from the U.S. Naval Academy the year the United States agreed to grant Philippine independence in 1934. During his freshman year, he was participant in soccer until a four-year mainstay in wrestling, earning letterman honors in his final three years. He competed at the 1936 Summer Olympics in the freestyle bantamweight class. In 1937, he began his Ordnance training at Picatinny Arsenal in New Jersey and then continued postgraduate studies in Ordnance training at the U.S. Army, Aberdeen Proving Ground in Maryland.

== Mindoro mission and death ==
Jurado by 1944 was working with Gen. Douglas MacArthur's SWPA Allied Intelligence Bureau and its sub-unit the Philippine Regional Section. He was assigned in Panay working with Lt. Col. Macario Peralta Jr. of the 6th Military District, and from here Peralta sent Jurado to Mindoro to take over the operational control of the guerrillas on the island, the Bolo Combat Team.

Upon reaching Mindoro in November 1943, Jurado would find himself in the middle of the power struggle between the two main factions of the guerrillas, Maj. Ramon Ruffy was the provincial commander of the Philippine Constabulary before the Japanese invasion, and Capt. Esteban Beloncio, who at once was Ruffy's executive officer and second-in-command. Jurado initially appointed Ruffy as the commanding officer of the Bolo Battalion, but by June 8, 1944, relieved him of command and replaced him with Beloncio.

Ruffy in turn threatened and ordered Jurado off the island. Jurado stood his ground, and the tension led to an encounter where Jurado was killed on October 19, 1944, by Ruffy's deputies, Jose L. Garcia, Prudente M. Francisco, Dominador Adeva and Andres Fortus.

Ruffy would later face trial over the murder, but would be acquitted, and his deputies pardoned.

== Legacy ==
On May 15, 1953, the Philippine Military Academy dedicated their gymnasium at Fort General Gregorio del Pilar in Baguio City, "Jurado Hall" in his honor. In June 2013, the original Jurado Hall was demolished to be upgraded to a modern sport complex. The newly completed Philippine Military Academy (PMA) Sports Complex, Jurado Hall, was inaugurated by President Benigno Aquino III on the morning of March 15, 2015. Fort Bonifacio, military headquarters of the Armed Forces of the Philippines in Manila, also named their gymnasium, Jurado Hall, after him. His name is also on a bronze plaque at Rizal Memorial Coliseum, a major sports arena in Manila.

His name is engraved with those of his United States Naval Academy classmates in Memorial Hall. His name is also on a bronze plaque on a staircase at USNA’s Dahlgren Hall.

The Philippine Navy commissioned BRP Enrique Jurado (PG-371) is the second ship of the Jose Andrada class coastal patrol boats on June 24, 1991. The patrol craft was part of the first batch of its class ordered through US Foreign Military Sales (FMS) in 1989.
