= BRP Banahaw =

Philippine presidential yacht

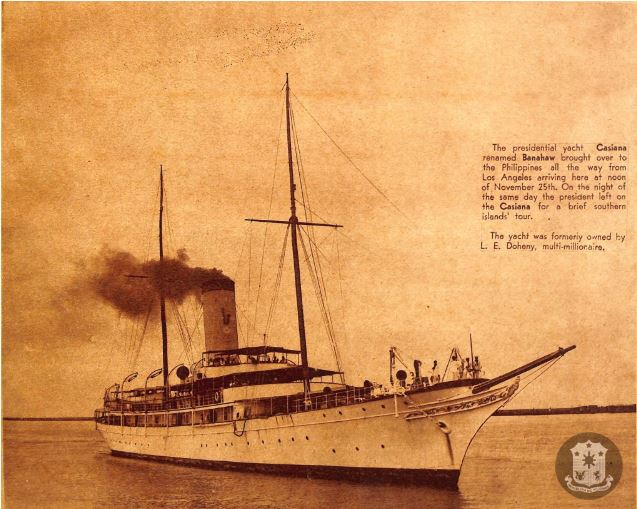
- The presidential yacht of the Philippines Banahaw arriving in the Philippines 25 November 1936

History

United States
- Name: Cassandra
- Builder: Scotts Shipbuilding and Engineering Company, Greenock
- Yard number: 423
- Launched: 19 February 1908
- Sponsored by: R. A. Rainy, New York
- Identification: 213590
- Fate: Sold to Edward L. Doheny, date uncertain

History

United States
- Owner: Edward L. Doheny
- Renamed: Casiana, date uncertain
- Fate: Sold to Commonwealth of the Philippines, 1936

History

Philippine Commonwealth
- Owner: Commonwealth of the Philippines
- Renamed: BRP Banahaw, 1936
- Home port: Manila
- Fate: Sunk by aircraft, 29 December 1941

General characteristics
- Type: yacht
- Tonnage: 1227 gross register tons
- Length: 254 ft (77 m) o/a
- Beam: 33 ft (10 m)
- Draught: 18.5 ft (5.6 m)
- Installed power: 313, net horsepower
- Propulsion: 2-propellers, 2 x T3 Cylinder steam, oil

BRP Banahaw (ex-Casiana, ex-Cassandra) was a British-built yacht that later served as the presidential yacht of the Commonwealth of the Philippines between 1936 and 1941.

== History ==
She was launched on 19 February 1908 at the Greenock shipyard of Scotts Shipbuilding and Engineering Company (John & Robert Scott) for R. A. Rainy of New York. Initially christened Cassandra, she was purchased by the American oil tycoon Edward L. Doheny who renamed her Casiana after his first oil well in Mexico, Casiana No. 7.

In 1936, she was purchased by the Commonwealth of the Philippines for $50,000 and arrived in the Philippines on 25 November 1936. She was officially assigned to the Coast Guard, although was primarily used as a presidential yacht. On December 29, 1941, she was attacked and sunk by Japanese aircraft while docked at the Fort Mills dock, Corregidor.

== History of her launch Baler ==
Her personal launch, Baler, was re-floated and repaired in December 1941. She served as patrol boat Q-115 Baler in the Offshore Patrol, United States Army Forces in the Far East, the first Philippine-manned torpedo boat squadron (consisting of three torpedo boats, Q-111 Luzon, Q-112 Abra, Q-113 Agusan, and another patrol boat, Q-114 Danday). Her commanding officer was Lieutenant Carlos Albert. The squadron patrolled the waters of the bay and protected the eastern shore of the Bataan Peninsula from Japanese infiltration. After Manila was declared an open city on 26 December 1941, the squadron operated out of Sisiman Cove, to the immediate east of Cavite and north of Corregidor where the American PT boats of Motor Torpedo Boat Squadron Three were also based. The squadron, along with its American counterparts, were serviced by the submarine tender Canopus, which was moored at Cavite Naval Base. In addition to conducting patrols, Q-115 delivered food, ammunition, troops, and medicine to the beleaguered troops during the Battle of Bataan and Battle of Corregidor. On 8 April 1942, after the fall of Bataan left the squadron without a safe port, it was decided to attempt to make an escape to Australia with the remaining 3 boats of the squadron (Danday had been bombed and destroyed on February 2). Q-112 developed engine troubles and had to return where it was scuttled at Navotas on 9 April 1942. The remainder of the squadron was intercepted by Japanese land-based Naval aircraft of the 1st Kōkūtai, and were able to down one plane. They were then intercepted by the Japanese destroyers Samidare and Murasame. The squadron attacked the destroyers with their torpedoes and machine gun fire but did not score any hits. Q-111 was hit and scuttled by its crew somewhere between Batangas and Cavite provinces on 9 April 1942. Q-113 and Q-115 returned to the safety of the bay where Q-113 was scuttled on 9 April 1942 to prevent Japanese capture. Q-115 was ultimately able to leave the bay with 23 passengers but was captured by the Japanese off Cabra Island.
