= Welcome Rotonda =

Roundabout in Quezon City, Philippines

- Mabuhay Rotonda
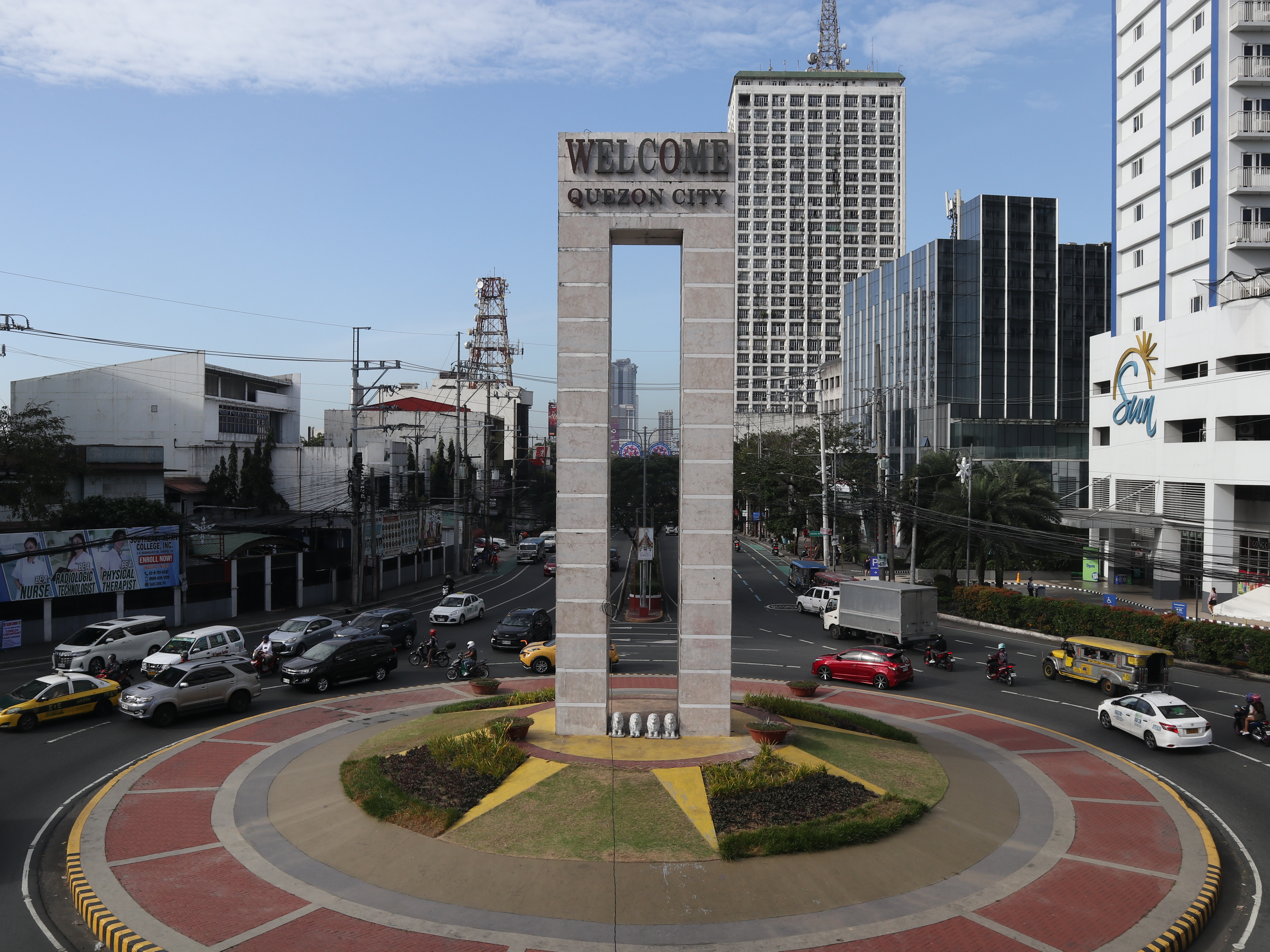
- Welcome Rotonda in 2025
- Interactive map of Welcome Rotonda

Location
- Quezon City, Metro Manila, Philippines
- Coordinates: 14°37′04.0″N 121°00′06.2″E
- Roads at junction: E. Rodriguez, Sr. Boulevard; Mayon Street; Nicanor Ramirez Street; N170 (Quezon Avenue); N170 (España Boulevard)

Construction
- Type: Roundabout
- Opened: 1948
- Maintained by: Department of Public Works and Highways

The Welcome Rotonda, officially the Mabuhay Rotonda, is a roundabout in Quezon City, Philippines. It is located a few meters from the city's border with Manila, at the intersection of E. Rodriguez, Sr. Boulevard, Mayon Street, Quezon Avenue, Nicanor Ramirez Street, and España Boulevard. The name may also refer to the monument situated on its central island. The roundabout also forms part of National Route 170 (N170) of the Philippine highway network.

== History ==
The roundabout was first opened in 1948, with a marble monument designed by Luciano V. Aquino erected at its center to welcome visitors to Quezon City, then the newly declared capital of the Philippines. The monument is surrounded by four lions, indicating the cardinal directions.

It served as the boundary between Manila and Rizal Province before the creation of Metro Manila in 1975. It is also a site for rallies and protests.

The roundabout was officially named Welcome Rotonda until May 17, 1995, when it was renamed Mabuhay Rotonda by then-Quezon City Mayor Ismael Mathay, Jr., following an initiative by local restaurateur Rod Ongpauco to promote the use of the Filipino expression "Mabuhay!" as a way of welcoming foreign visitors to the Philippines.

== Notable protests ==
=== September 1984 protest dispersal ===
On September 27, 1984, Welcome Rotonda became the site of one of the most infamous protest dispersals during the dictatorship of Ferdinand Marcos, in which pro-Marcos forces fired tear gas on several thousand peaceful protesters which included 80-year-old former Senator Lorenzo Tanada and 71-year old Manila Times founder Chino Roces; and fired into the crowd, hitting student leader (and later UP Diliman Chancellor) Fidel Nemenzo in the kidney.

Other intellectuals, opposition leaders, artists, and journalists who participated in the rally were:

- Tanada's son (and later Senator) Wigberto Tanada,
- Constitutional Convention delegate (and later Philippine Vice President) Teofisto Guingona,
- human rights lawyer (and later Senator) Rene Saguisag,
- August Twenty One Movement (ATOM) and Bansang Nagkakaisa sa Diwa at Layunin (BANDILA) founder (and later Senator) Butz Aquino,
- human rights activist Ed Garcia,
- later Tarlac Governor Tingting Cojuangco,
- WE Forum photographer Lito Ocampo,
- activist and writer Susan Quimpo,
- Cebuana radio commentator Nenita Cortes-Daluz; and
- film director Behn Cervantes.

Iconic images showing Lorenzo Tanada and Chino Roces struggling against the waterhosing and teargas unleashed by the pro-Marcos forces led to a further decline in support for Ferdinand Marcos, who was already losing significant support in the wake of the assassination of Benigno Aquino Jr. the year before.

=== 1995 Ducat hunger strike ===
The roundabout attracted attention during the 1995 general election when businessman Amando "Jun" Ducat, Jr.—who would later be known for kidnapping 26 students in 2007 near Manila City Hall—scaled the monument and staged a hunger strike at the top. He did this to dramatize his opposition to Chinese Filipinos running for public office, which he opposed because of their alleged control of the Philippines' rice trade. He wanted the government to ban Chinese Filipinos from being candidates, and he sought to convince voters to vote against them.

=== 2023 road rage incident ===
In 2023, Wilfredo Gonzales, a former police officer, threatened to shoot and slapped the head of Allan Bandiola, a cyclist. The incident became a cause celebre, having been investigated by the Land Transportation Office and the Senate.

== Transportation hub ==
The Welcome Rotonda is known as a transportation center. It served as one of the first terminals for jeepneys as they began plying the streets of Manila after World War II.

== See also ==
- Quezon Memorial Circle and Elliptical Road - a similar roundabout in Quezon City at the other end of Quezon Avenue
- Selamat Datang Monument - a similar roundabout and monument in central Jakarta
- Media related to Welcome Rotonda at Wikimedia Commons
