= 1974 Sacred Heart Novitiate raid =

The August 24, 1974 military raid on the Sacred Heart Novitiate in the Novaliches district of Quezon City in the Philippines is considered an important turning point in the Philippine Catholic Church's resistance to the Marcos dictatorship. It was one of the key contributors to the emergence of the "middle force" of the opposition to Ferdinand Marcos, which were willing to work towards the dictator's ouster but were not part of the leftist opposition which had led the movement against Marcos up until that point.

A Jesuit seminary, the Novitiate had become the subject of the raid because the regime's forces had mistakenly thought that a communist leader was holding a meeting there. When the 150 soldiers who conducted the raid found that the communist leader they were looking for was not at the seminary, they arrested a priest, Jose Blanco, and accused him of being the "secretary general of an allegedly anti-government organization." They also arrested the head of the Jesuit order in the Philippines at the time, Benigno "Benny" Mayo, and 21 leaders of a youth group called Student Catholic Action (SCA), who were at the seminary to attend a workshop.

The raid took place mere months after the appointment of Cardinal Jaime Sin as the new Archbishop of Manila, and it resulted in Sin's first act of dissent against the Marcos dictatorship - issuing a pastoral letter which would be read aloud in all the churches of the Archdiocese of Manila, which covered the whole of the Philippines' capital region. Various leaders of the Catholic Church in the Philippines would continue to criticize and sometimes actively resist Ferdinand Marcos' dictatorship for the next fourteen years, culminating with Sin calling on Filipinos to rally in the streets in late February 1986 - the beginning of the People Power Revolution which finally ousted Marcos.

== See also ==
- Martial law under Ferdinand Marcos
