= Criticism of fascism =

Criticism of the fascist political ideology

Criticism of fascism has come from diverse groups, including many political ideologies, academic disciplines, survivors of fascist governments, and other observers.

The defeat of the Axis powers in World War II and subsequent revelation of the crimes against humanity committed during the Holocaust by Nazi Germany have led to an almost universal condemnation of both past and present forms of fascism in the modern era. "Fascism" is today used across the political spectrum as a pejorative or byword for perceived authoritarianism and other forms of political evil.

== Topics of criticism ==
=== Anti-democratic and tyrannical ===
Hitler and Spanish dictator Francisco Franco in Meeting at Hendaye, on 23 October 1940

One of the most common and strongest criticisms of fascism is that it is a tyranny. Fascism is deliberately and entirely non-democratic and anti-democratic.

Fascism's extreme authoritarianism and nationalism often manifest as a belief in racial purity or a master race, usually blended with some variant of racism or discrimination against a demonized "Other", such as Jews, homosexuals, transgender people, ethnic minorities, or immigrants. These ideas have motivated fascist regimes to commit massacres, forced sterilizations, deportations, and genocides. During World War II, the genocidal and imperialist ambitions of the fascist Axis powers resulted in the murder of millions of people. Federico Finchelstein wrote that fascism

...encompassed totalitarianism, state terrorism, imperialism, racism and, in the German case, the most radical genocide of the last century: the Holocaust. Fascism, in its many forms, did not hesitate to kill its own citizens as well as its colonial subjects in its search for ideological and political closure. Millions of civilians perished on a global scale during the apogee of fascist ideologies in Europe and beyond.

Historian Robert Paxton wrote that fascism

redrew the frontiers between private and public, sharply diminishing what had once been untouchably private. It changed the practice of citizenship from the enjoyment of constitutional rights and duties to participation in mass ceremonies of affirmation and conformity. It reconfigured relations between the individual and the collectivity, so that an individual had no rights outside community interest.

The word "totalitarian" (Italian: totalitaria) was coined in response to fascism, and many observers consider that fascism is a type of totalitarianism. It was first used in May 1923 in an article by Giovanni Amendola, who used it to describe the Fascist efforts to control all public offices, but the term quickly expanded to include Fascist attempts at other types of total control.

=== Ideological dishonesty ===
Franz Neumann observed that "National Socialism’s ideology is constantly shifting...It has certain magical beliefs—leadership adoration, supremacy of the master race—but [it] is not laid down in a series of categorical and dogmatic pronouncements." Historian Robert Paxton argued that fascism was unlike other ideologies of the same time period, because

fascism bears a different relation to ideas...[Its] intellectual positions (not basic mobilizing passions like racial hatreds, of course) were likely to be dropped or added according to the tactical needs of the moment. All the "isms" did this, but only fascism had such contempt for reason and intellect that it never even bothered to justify its shifts."

=== Glorification of war ===
Fascism views war as a positive experience and a means to national rejuvenation. Walter Laqueur discussed the "cult of war" and nostalgia for danger among some survivors of WWI. Mussolini believed that the primary role of men is to be warriors, once saying, "War is to man what maternity is to the woman."

Filippo Tommaso Marinetti, founder of the Futurist art movement and co-author of the Fascist Manifesto (1919), aestheticized war in his writings and claimed that "war is beautiful."

In The Anatomy of Fascism, Paxton wrote that fascist governments need to actively acquire new territory in order to survive, which leads to their choice to pursue aggressive wars. Paxton distinguishes between military glorification in authoritarian dictatorships, which use "military pomp, but little actual fighting, to help prop up regimes dedicated to preserving the status quo," and "the emotional commitment of fascist regimes to war."

Conversely, Morgan and Bret Devereaux wrote that by losing in World War Two, fascism failed to meet its own standards for success. Devereaux evaluated a series of fascist and near-fascist historical regimes, and described a general trend for them to do poorly in war, despite military effectiveness being a central principle that fascism uses to justify itself. He wrote that of the two unambiguously fascist historical regimes, both were destroyed in wars they started, with Nazi Germany losing its war "as thoroughly and completely as it is possible to lose". Similarly, he described Fascist Italy as only achieving military successes in colonial wars that were won at great cost and with severe repercussions for Italy’s international standing. When analyzing other regimes that have been considered fascist under various definitions, such as the Ba'athist regimes of Syria and Iraq, he found that their records in war were also very poor. Morgan wrote that when fascism "failed the test that it had set for itself" by being unable to win in WWII, this was a major factor in the collapse in support for the Italian regime. Historian Mark Mazower wrote that while the Nazis focused extensively on military production, and fascist rhetoric emphasized efficiency and coordination in the economy, they were unable to succeed on these factors and the German war economy was ultimately outperformed by both the capitalists and the communists. Umberto Eco wrote that fascist rhetoric undermines its own war effort because enemies are described as both "too strong and too weak", leading to governments which are "condemned to lose wars because they are constitutionally incapable of objectively evaluating the force of the enemy."

In general, non-democracies are less likely to win wars than democracies. This has been attributed to factors such as poor use of resources when compared to democracies, less effective cooperation with allies, and reduced initiative and inferior leadership in the military.

=== Governance and economy ===
Historian Hans Mommsen observed that the Nazi government was "not organized on rational principles of bureaucratic efficiency" and that Hitler was disengaged from affairs of state, which ultimately made him a “weak dictator.” Paxton wrote that Hitler's leadership "reduced government to personal fiefdoms unable to discuss policy options and choose among them rationally”, and Mussolini was likewise unable to make government run more efficiently.

Once in power, fascist governments attempted to present an image of constant unity behind the leader. This idea was supported by propaganda and was widely believed, and still exists in popular conceptions of fascist governments. However, factions within fascist governments frequently opposed each other. There were significant conflicts between conservatives, fascists, and traditional elites, as well as between the party and state (as in Ernst Fraenkel's model of the normative state and the prerogative state). Paxton described a permanent four-way tension between the fascist leader, the party, the state apparatus, and civil society. Since all the groups required the support of the others, their relationship involved "protracted struggles for supremacy" within the fascist government. He wrote, "We must see fascist rule as a never-ending struggle for preeminence within a coalition, exacerbated by the collapse of constitutional restraints and the rule of law, and by a prevailing climate of social Darwinism".

Paxton wrote that some scholars thought of fascism as a "developmental dictatorship" which could increase a country's industrial growth, but this idea "goes seriously wrong...in supposing that fascism pursued any rational economic goal whatever. Hitler meant to bend the economy to serve political ends. Even in Mussolini’s case, prestige counted far more than economic rationality when he overvalued the lira in 1926, and when, after 1935, he chose the risks of expansionist war over sustained economic development." In addition, while the Italian economy grew under Mussolini, its growth rate was much faster both before 1914 and after 1945.

== See also ==
- Fascist ideology
