= North Central Sociological Association =

American organization

- Abbreviation: NCSA
- Formation: 1925
- Region served: East North Central States (and Ontario, Canada)
- President: Geoffrey Wood
- Publication: Sociological Focus
- Website: www.ncsanet.org
- Formerly called: Ohio Sociological Society, Ohio Valley Sociological Society

The North Central Sociological Association is a regional sociology association covering multiple parts of the U.S. Midwest, namely: Eastern Illinois, Indiana, Michigan, Ohio, Kentucky, Western Pennsylvania, and West Virginia. It also covers Ontario, Canada. It was founded in 1925 as a result of an American Sociological Society meeting held the previous December. It was originally called the Ohio Sociological Society, and changed its name to the Ohio Valley Sociological Society in 1937, whereupon it expanded to include multiple other states besides Ohio. Its official journal is Sociological Focus, which has been published continuously since 1968. Previously its journal was known as The Ohio Valley Sociologist between 1938 and 1967, and from 1927 to 1938 was called The Ohio Sociologist.
