= Susan Quimpo =

Filipino activist (1961–2020)

- Born: February 6, 1961
- Died: July 14, 2020 (aged 59)
- Occupations: activist, author, and art therapist
- Notable work: Subversive Lives: A Family Memoir of the Marcos Years
- Spouse: George Chiu
- Parent(s): Ishmael Quimpo, Sr. and Esperanza Ferrer
- Relatives: Ishmael Quimpo, Jr. Ronald Jan Quimpo; Nathan Gilbert Quimpo

Susan Ferrer Quimpo (February 6, 1961 – July 14, 2020) was a Filipino activist, author, theater artist, and art therapist best known for her advocacy work of educating the Filipino youth about the Philippines’ Martial Law era, and for co-writing the book "Subversive Lives: A Family Memoir of the Marcos Years."

== Early life ==
Susan Quimpo was born the youngest among the ten children of Ishmael and Esperanza Quimpo, and was a child when Martial Law was declared in 1972.

== Family activism during martial law ==
The Quimpo siblings became a family of activists, with seven of her siblings joining the underground resistance against the Marcos dictatorship. One, Ishmael Jr., was murdered by the dictatorship, while another, Ronald Jan, was abducted at the age of 23 and is presumed dead.

== University of the Philippines and martial law ==
Quimpo became a college student during the Martial law era, and like her older siblings, she became an activist, decrying the abuses of the Marcos dictatorship. She was part of the theater group, Peryante.

== Tagalog On Site ==
After martial law, Quimpo took up a master's degree in Southeast Asian Studies in the US, living for a few years in Washington, DC and New York City. Realizing that many need Filipino-Americans had a need to learn about their ancestral country, she and her husband George Chiu organized Tagalog On Site, a non-government organization whose main activity was to take Filipino American students to the Philippines for summer trips, in which they would learn about the language, culture and history of the Philippines.

== Subversive Lives ==
As a tribute to the generation of Filipinos who fought against the Marcos dictatorship, she and her brother Nathan Gilbert Quimpo decided to put together a book which narrates the story of the Quimpo family, using the gathered narratives of all the surviving siblings. The result was "Subversive Lives: A Family Memoir of the Marcos Years."

Historian and former National Historical Commission chair Ambeth Ocampo, in a 2020 column written soon after Quimpo's death, noted:

In "Subversive Lives," the Quimpos are narrators coming to terms with the past and taking us along with them in their long and painful journey. Today, more than ever, we need more accounts of the martial law years, for without these we won’t have history.

== Therapy for martial law survivors ==
As a therapist, Quimpo was also known for offering art therapy to surviving victims of the Martial Law regime, encouraging them to heal by expressing their repressed memories through art. She offered similar services to survivors of natural disasters, and to those experienced political persecution.

== The Martial Law Chronicles ==
Wanting to take a more direct approach ensuring that the Philippines' Martial Law era was remembered, Quimpo helped launch The Martial Law Chronicles, a campaign that put together exhibits and in-person presentations on high school and college campuses and which trains high school teachers how to teach their students about the Philippines' martial law, in 2016.

== Diagnosis and death ==
Quimpo was diagnosed with systemic scleroderma, a painful autoimmune disease, in 2018, and died two years later, on July 14, 2020. Throughout that time, she continued to approach schools, asking them if she could speak to their students about the history of martial law in the Philippines.

== Portrayals in culture and the arts ==
Actress Rigel Hechanova portrayed Susan Quimpo in the Delphine Buencamino directed 2026 stageplay "Subversive Lives," which dramatizes the book.
