= National Defense Act of 1935 =

Philippine military-formation law interrupted by WWII

National Assembly of the Philippines
- Long title: An Act to provide National Defense of the Philippines, penalizing certain violations thereof, appropriating funds therefor, and for other purposes
- Citation: Commonwealth Act No. 1
- Territorial extent: Philippines
- Enacted by: National Assembly of the Philippines
- Enacted: December 21, 1935
- Signed by: Manuel L. Quezon
- Signed: December 21, 1935

Keywords
- Military, national security
- Status: In force

The National Defense Act of 1935 (Commonwealth Act No. 1) was passed by the Philippine National Assembly on December 21, 1935. The purpose of this act was to create national military forces for the eventually-independent Republic of the Philippines, a move interrupted by the outbreak of the Second World War.

== Provisions ==
This act provided for the creation, by 1946, via an annual appropriation of 16,000,000 pesos, of the following forces:

- A regular army force of 10,000 troops (formed largely from the Philippine Scouts and the Philippine Constabulary)
- A reserve army of 400,000
- The Offshore Patrol, which was to possess 36 torpedo boats
- A Philippine Army Air Corps of 100 tactical bombers

== Office of the Military Advisor ==
The National Assembly was guided by the Office of the Military Advisor to the Commonwealth Government under the U.S. General Douglas MacArthur.

== Military Districts ==
The act divided the Commonwealth of the Philippines into ten military districts, similar to the prewar corps areas within the US. Each district had a roughly equal population and each was to initially provide 1 reserve division, and ultimately three.

- Luzon, Mindoro, Palawan, and Masbate contained 5 military districts
- Mindanao and the Sulu Archipelago constituted 1 district
- The Visayas contained 4 districts

== Reserve Training ==
The act provided for the drafting of Filipino men, between the ages of 21 and 50, into the 30 reserve divisions. This force was to be raised through 2 training camps, of 20,000 men each, lasting 22 weeks. The camps would be staffed by members of the regular army.

The first group of 20,000 troops was drafted on January 1, 1937, and there were 4,800 officers and 104,000 enlisted men in the reserves by 1939.

== Officer Training ==
For the training of selected candidates for permanent commission in the Regular Force, the act provided that a military training school named the Philippine Military Academy be established with a Cadet Corps strength not to exceed 350 at any one time. As graduates could not be expected until they had completed 4 years of training, selected reservists were selected for training as noncommissioned officers. The best of these were then given basic office training and commissioned as 3rd Lieutenants. Officers were also created through senior-level ROTC courses in colleges and universities.

== Training Locations ==
- Infantry training—various locations
- Field Artillery training—Fort Dau and specialized training conducted at Fort William McKinley
- Coastal Artillery training -- Fort Mills, Fort Stotsenburg (antiaircraft), and Fort Wint
- Signal and medical training -- Fort William McKinley
- Quartermaster motor transport school — Port area of Manila
- Government organizational training—various locations

== See also ==
- Military History of the Philippines
- Military History of the United States
