= WE Forum =

Philippine newspaper, 1977–1985

- Founded: 1977; 49 years ago
- Ceased publication: 1985; 41 years ago
- Language: English
- City: Quezon City
- Country: Philippines

The WE Forum was a fortnightly newspaper in the Philippines founded by Jose Burgos Jr. in 1977, while Martial law under Ferdinand Marcos was still in effect. It was known for its hard-hitting coverage critical of the Marcos administration, which was rare at a time when most publications portrayed the Marcos regime in a positive light. In November 1982, the WE Forum published a story by Colonel Bonifacio Gillego, exposing the falsehood of Ferdinand Marcos' supposed wartime medals. The METROCOM Intelligence and Security Group, acting on Marcos' orders, retaliated in what has since become known as the WE Forum raid. They arrested Burgos and his staff for a month and padlocked the paper's facilities, shutting the WE Forum down until December 1984 when the Supreme Court declared the raid illegal, dismissing all evidence against the WE Forum and rendering its staff relieved. Burgos relaunched WE Forum in addition to Malaya, a daily broadsheet he had begun publishing while the WE Forum case was still being heard in court. Publication of the WE Forum finally ended in 1985, while Malaya became a major industry player during the days of the 1986 People Power revolution.
