= Bonifacio Gillego =

Filipino politician (1921–2002)

Bonifacio H. Gillego
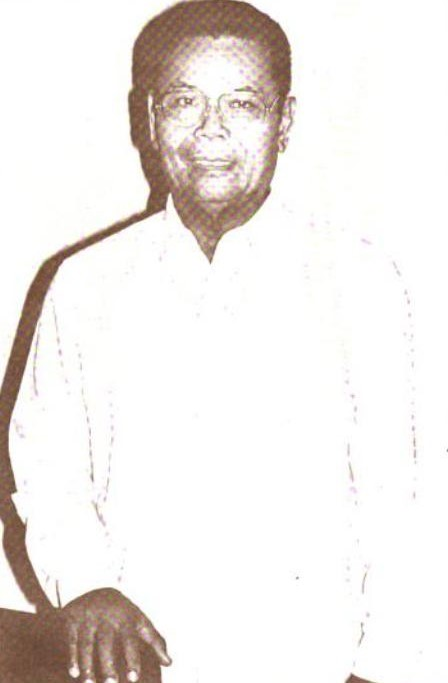
- Gillego official portrait during the 8th Congress.

Member of House of Representatives of the Philippines from Sorsogon's 2nd congressional district
- In office June 30, 1987 – June 30, 1998
- Preceded by: None
- Succeeded by: Rodolfo F. Gonzales

Personal details
- Born: Bonifacio Hubilla Gillego; June 5, 1921 Bulan, Sorsogon, Philippine Islands
- Died: August 1, 2002 (aged 81)
- Party: Lakas (1992–2002)
- Other political affiliations: LDP (1988–1992); LnB (1987–1988)
- Spouse: Dolores Perez Gillego
- Children: 7
- Education: Far Eastern University; Johns Hopkins University
- Profession: Lawyer; Writer; Politician

Military service
- Allegiance: Philippines
- Rank: Colonel; Major
- Battles/wars: World War II; Korean War

Bonifacio Hubilla Gillego (June 5, 1921 – August 1, 2002) was a Philippine politician, military officer, and author. He served in the Philippine House of Representatives for three terms (1987–1998), representing the 2nd Legislative District of Sorsogon. "Boni" was one of the Framers of the 1987 Constitution. He had also served as a delegate to the Constitutional Convention in 1970.

For his resistance against the Marcos dictatorship, which led to a 14-year exile from the country, Gillego is one of the heroes honored by having his name etched at the wall of remembrance at the Philippines' Bantayog ng mga Bayani, which honors the martyrs and heroes who fought the authoritarian regime of Ferdinand Marcos.

== Background ==
Gillego earned his degrees in English and Philosophy at the Far Eastern University in Manila in 1950. He earned a master's degree from the Johns Hopkins University School of Advanced International Studies as an Armed Forces of the Philippines Scholar. His eldest sister, Celerina Gotladera, served as the Chairman of Civil Service Commission and Mayor of Bulan, Sorsogon. He is a cousin of Gregorio Honasan.

== Military career ==
He was also part of the resistance during the Japanese occupation of the Philippines. As a soldier, Gillego served in the Korean War and served in Operation Brotherhood in Laos.

== Marcos Era: Exile and Resistance ==
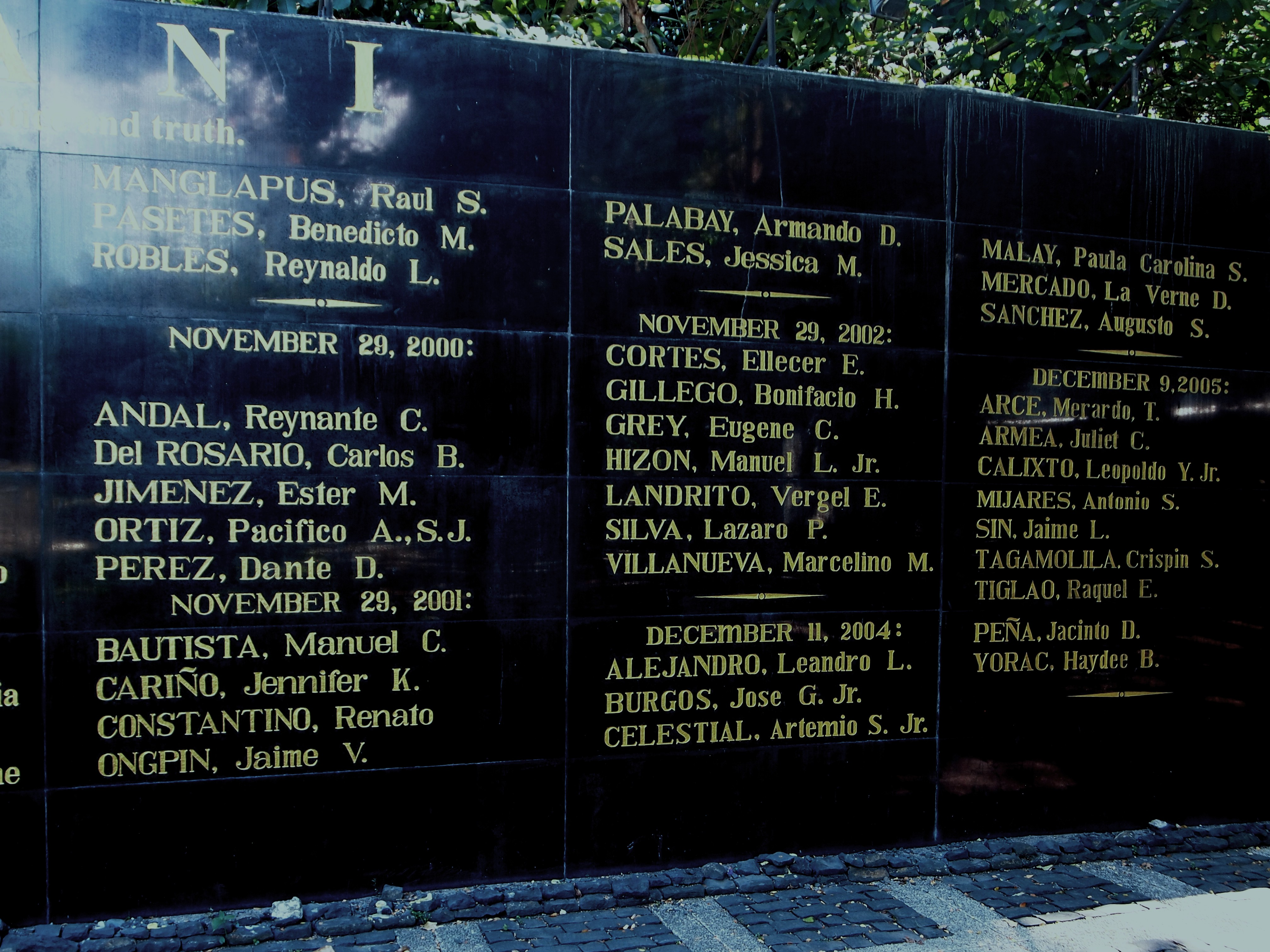
Detail of the Wall of Remembrance at the Bantayog ng mga Bayani, showing names from the 2002 batch of Bantayog Honorees, including that of Congressman Gillego.

Gillego was exiled in the United States for 14 years during martial law. He was one of the leaders of the opposition to Marcos in the United States and was a member of the Movement for a Free Philippines (MFP) during his exile. Gillego was often interviewed by American and western media to expose Marcos' fraud, particularly with his military medal decorations. Through his writings and countless interviews with the American press, Gillego publicly questioned Marcos' war record. In 1986, he served on the Commission on Good Government on behalf of President Corazon Aquino to find real estate holdings of the Marcoses in New York.

== Congress ==
As a Congressman, "Boni" was known for his spartan lifestyle and stance against government corruption. One of his key accomplishments in Congress was agrarian reform legislation passed in June 1988.

== Books and articles ==
- Requiem for Reformism: The Ideas of Rizal on Reform and Revolution (1990)
- "The Other Version of FM's War Exploits". We Forum (November 1982)
- "Marcos: The Hero of Kiangan Who Never Was". Philippine News (September 1982)
- "Our Police Forces as a Tool of American Imperialism". Ronin (October 1972)

House of Representatives of the Philippines	Recreated Title last held by Rafael Aquino	Member of the House of Representatives from Sorsogon's 2nd district 1987–1998	Succeeded by Rodolfo Gonzales
