= Timeline of the Ferdinand Marcos presidency =

This timeline of the presidency of Ferdinand Marcos in the Philippines covers three periods of Philippine history in which Marcos wielded political control. First, it covers the period of Marcos' first two terms—1965 to 1969 and 1969 to 1972—under the 1935 Constitution, as well as the antecedent events which brought Marcos to political power. Second, it covers the period in which Proclamation 1081, which put the entirety of the Philippines under Martial Law, was in force—from September 1972 to January 1981. Lastly, it covers the entirety of the period described as the "Fourth Republic," where the Philippines was governed by the 1973 Marcos Constitution after the formal lifting of Proclamation No. 1081.

The timeline covers many of the events highlighted in narrations of Philippine history since history-writing often has a slant towards political events. However, numerous historical events—especially typhoons and earthquakes—that took place in the Philippines during the Marcos presidency era are excluded from the list, as they are not primarily political in nature and did not highlight the political involvement of the Marcos administration.

== First and second terms, and antecedent events (1965–1972 and earlier) ==
Year	Date	Event	Source
1965	November 9	Ferdinand Marcos elected President of the Republic of the Philippines.	
1965	December 30	Ferdinand Marcos takes his oath of office.	
1966	January 11-22	Marcos includes Philippine Navy Commodore Ramon Alcaraz in a broadcast list of officials accused of corruption after Alcaraz refuses Marcos' orders to reduce the navy's antismuggling patrols. Refusing to take Marcos' accusations quietly, Alcaraz rejected the accusation, criticized Marcos' defense policies, and walked out of a session of the House Defense Committee as he announced he was leaving the Navy. Marcos withdraws his accusation to stop Bulacan Representative Rogaciano Mercado from continuing a congressional exposé which Historian Alfred W. McCoy suggests would have covered Marcos' alleged meeting "with smuggler-king [Lino] Bocalan."	
1966	June 25	Marcos issues Executive Order 66, paving the way for the construction of the Cultural Center of the Philippines and appointing a six-member board that promptly elects first lady Imelda Marcos as chair.	
1967	May 21	A demonstration conducted by Lapiang Malaya ends in a violent dispersal by the Philippine Constabulary, killing 33.	
1967	August 8	ASEAN (Association of Southeast Asian Nations) was formed.	
1968	March 18	In the Jabidah massacre, 68 members of a secret commando unit recruited by the Armed Forces of the Philippines are killed when they refuse further training.	
1968	May 1	Two months after the Jabidah Massacre, former Cotabato Governor Datu Udtog Matalam issues a manifesto declaring the creation of what would later be called the Mindanao Independence Movement, seeking the independence of the Mindanao, Sulu, and Palawan regions from the Philippines.	
1968	May	The Mindanao Independence Movement is short lived; failing to garner the support of the Muslim masses. But it causes fear among non-Muslim settlers. The Marcos administration encourages the settlers to form of self-defense groups, which would later be known as the Ilagas.	
1968	November	Matalam changes his positions five months later and becomes Ferdinand Marcos' adviser on Muslim Affairs.	
1968	December 26	The Communist Party of the Philippines is established.	
1969	March 29	The New People's Army is formally organized as the military arm of the Communist Party of the Philippines	
1969	June 14	Marking the beginning of Ferdinand Marcos' 1969 Presidential campaign, the Nacionalista Party Junta, led by Senate President Gil Puyat, hold a meeting at the Manila Banking Corporation building on Ayala Avenue, Makati, to assure that Ferdinand Marcos and Fernando Lopez would be nominated unchallenged at the Nacionalista Party convention a week later. President Marcos joins the group once the decision on his nomination has been finalized.	
1969	July 3–5	U.S. President Richard Nixon visits the Philippines.	
1969	August	A few months before the 1969 Philippine presidential election, long-time Marcos associate and campaign donor Rodolfo Cuenca's Construction and Development Corporation began construction on the high-visibility San Juanico Bridge project linking Samar to first lady Imelda Marcos' home province of Leyte, sparking questions about the timing of the project when there was very little need for highway travel across the straight at the time. Bureau of Public Highways commissioner Baltazar Aquino eventually reveals that Marubeni Corporation of Japan paid Marcos a 15% bribe supplier of the materials and equipment for the project.	
1969	September	The Cultural Center of the Philippines in Manila is inaugurated, with costs ballooning so high by December 1968 (PhP48 million from the original budget of PhP15 million) that Imelda was forced to seek US$7 million to finish the project in time to be a Marcos showcase for the 1969 presidential election.	
1969	November 11	The 1969 Philippine presidential election is held.	
	December 30	The Second inauguration of Ferdinand Marcos is held at Quirino Grandstand	
1970	January–March	First Quarter Storm: January 26 – It begins when protesting students confronted Pres. Marcos after his Presidential Address in the Old Legislative Building, Manila.; January 30 – Battle of Mendiola occurs.; February 18 & 26 – People's Congresses held in Plaza Miranda.; March 3 – People's March is organized, route is from Welcome Rotonda to Liwasang Bonifacio.	
1970	March 23	Brothers Quintin and Rizal Yuyitung of the Chinese Commercial News are arrested on subversion charges and clandestinely deported to Taiwan	
1970	April	A large rally at Plaza Miranda is dispersed, resulting in a street battle between protesters and government forces	
1970	April 6	A jeepney strike paralyzes greater Manila.	
1970	June 27	President Marcos endorses the formation of Barrio Self Defense Units (BDSUs), which would eventually be renamed the Civilian Home Defense Forces.	
1970	November 17	Elections for 315 members of a Constitutional Convention held.	
1970	November 27	Pope Paul VI makes his first papal visit in the Philippines. He survives an assassination attempt by Benjamín Mendoza y Amor Flores at Manila International Airport.	
1970	December 29	Forces led by Lt. Victor Corpuz raid the armory of the Philippine Military Academy.	
1971	February 1–9	Diliman commune	
1971	June 1	The Constitutional Convention assembles to rewrite the 1935 Constitution. The convention elects former Pres. Carlos Garcia as its head.	
1971	June 14	Death of Carlos Garcia, former Philippine President; another former Pres. Diosdado Macapagal succeeds as the president of the Constitutional Convention.	
1971	June 19	Manili massacre	
1971	August 21	Plaza Miranda is bombed during the Liberal Party's election campaign, seriously injuring some opposition personalities.	
1971	August 22	Pres. Marcos suspends the Writ of Habeas Corpus following the Plaza Miranda bombing.	
1971	September 1	Naval Station Sangley Point is formally turned over the Philippine government, ending 73 years as a US Naval Base.	
1971	November 8	1971 Philippine Senate election	
1972	January 11	Pres. Marcos restores the Writ of Habeas Corpus	
1972	March to September	Various explosions take place in the greater Manila area, which would later be called the 1972 Manila bombings; the administration attributes the explosions to communists, but this is questioned by legislators who noted that the only suspects caught in connection to the explosions were actually linked to the Philippine Constabulary.	
1972	May 19	Constitutional Convention delegate Eduardo Quintero delivers a privilege speech, in which he exposes bribery at the Constitutional Convention	
1972	May 30	Quintero provides further details, identifying Imelda Marcos and three others as the source of the payola money used for bribery at the Constitutional Convention	
1972	July 5	MV Karagatan incident; The Philippine Constabulary confiscates arms and ammunition in a raid in Digoyo Point, Isabela.	
1972	September 13	Oplan Sagittarius, a top-secret plan to place the capital under military control, is exposed by Senator Benigno Aquino, using information provided by Brig. Gen. Marcos Soliman.	

== Martial law period (September 1972 – January 1981) ==
Year	Date	Event	Source
1972	September 17 or 21 (accounts vary)	Pres. Marcos signs the Proclamation No. 1081 document, placing the entirety of the Philippines under Martial Law.	
1972	September 22	Defense Minister Juan Ponce Enrile survives an "assassination" attempt.	
1972	September 22	Pres. Marcos announces that he had placed the entire country under martial law, with the earlier "ambush" as a pretext.	
1972	September 22	Marcos issues Letter of Instruction no. 1, which orders the closure of media establishments and wire agencies.	
1972	September 22	Sen. Ninoy Aquino is the first person to arrested under Proclamation No. 1081, at a late-night meeting of opposition legislators, shortly before midnight.	
1972	September 23	In the early morning hours following Aquino Jr.'s arrest, media practitioners and opposition figures are arrested, including Senators Francisco Soc Rodrigo, Jose Diokno, and Ramon Mitra Jr.	
1972	September 23	Government forces shut down media outlets, including broadsheets the Manila Times; Daily Mirror; Manila Chronicle; Manila Daily Bulletin; Philippine Daily Express; Philippines Herald; Philippine Free Press, Graphic; and the Nation. Media outlets owned by Marcos crony Roberto Benedicto are exempted: newspaper Daily Express and television and radio stations of Kanlaon Broadcasting System.	
1972	September 23	Press Secretary Francisco Tatad announces the implementation of martial law in the late afternoon; Ferdinand Marcos goes on air at 7:00 PM to formalize the announcement. Demonstrations are banned, and a curfew is imposed.	
1972	October 21	The Moro National Liberation Front, a splinter group from the Muslim Independence Movement led by Nur Misuari, is officially formed	
1972	October 21–23	Upon its formation, the MNLF launches an attack on Marawi, Lanao del Sur. The group targets the Philippine Constabulary headquarters, a government radio station, and the campus of the Mindanao State University. Government troops eventually retake the city. 75 persons are killed.	
1972	October 23	Presidential Decree 27 is issued, declaring the entirety of the Philippines as a "Land Reform area".	
1972	November 2	Presidential Decree 36 is issued, canceling the franchises and permits of all mass media facilities allegedly trying to topple the government, and creating the Mass Media Council which determines the granting of certificates of authority to newspapers, radio, and TV. It would later be restructured as the Media Advisory Council. Primitivo Mijares serves as chair of the council as well as of the National Press Club.	
1972	November 29	The Constitutional Convention passes the new Constitution of the Philippines, which is supposed to be ratified via a plebiscite.	
1972	December 7	Carlito Dimahilig attacks Imelda Marcos with a bolo in a failed assassination attempt during an event for her National Beautification and Cleanliness campaign. Congressman Jose D. Aspiras and beautification campaign administrator Linda Amor Robles also suffer lacerations.	
1972	December 31	Marcos issues Presidential Decree 86, the "Revised Barrio charter", which cancels the polls for the ratification of the new constitution, and replaces them with Citizen's Assemblies which would be held in the next month, January 1973.	
1973	January 10–15	In the first constitutional referendum of 1973, voters in the Philippines' 35,000 barangays are gathered into "Citizen's Assemblies," where they are told indicate via show of hands whether they agreed to the continuation of Martial Law, the closure of Congress, and the ratification of the new constitution. Accounts of these citizen assemblies later claim that the questions were misrepresented to the assembled voters, and court cases are filed saying that "there is no proper submission to the people there being no freedom of speech, press and assembly, and there being no sufficient time to inform the people of the contents thereof."	
1973	January 15	Chinese drug lord Lim Seng is executed by firing squad in public in Fort Bonifacio for drug trafficking.	
1973	January 17	Marcos issues Proclamation 1102, declaring the approval of the 1973 Constitution and ordering Congress to be padlocked.	
1973	March 31	A majority decision by the Supreme Court dismisses a case that questions the validity of Proclamation 1102, saying that the question of the proclamation's validity was merely "a political question." The decision effectively upholds the validity of the 1973 Constitution. Chief Justice Roberto Concepcion writes the decision, outlining the facts of the case, and then writes his own dissenting opinion.	
1973	April 24	The National Democratic Front (NDF) is formally organized.	
1973	April	Kapisanan ng mga Brodkaster ng Pilipinas (KBP) is established	
1973	May	The Masagana 99 program is launched	
1973	July 27	A second constitutional referendum is held, in which the constituent assemblies vote via show of hands to supposedly ratify the 1973 constitution, suspend the creation of the Interim National Assembly, and extend Martial Law. Ferdinand Marcos's term as president is effectively extended.	
1973	September 1	Marcos exercises Presidential Decree 87 (the Oil Exploration and Development Act of 1972) and signs a US$12 million service contract with Americans, Canadian and Philippine companies for oil exploration, exempting them from all taxes except income tax, and all duties for importation of materials to be used for exploration.	
1973	October 20	Marcos appoints Querube Makalintal as Chief Justice of the Supreme Court, replacing Roberto Concepcion.	
1973	November 8	Marcos orders a longer semestral break and a three-day weekend in order to save on energy.	
1973	November 12	A nationwide gasoline rationing system is put in place, and the Philippine National Oil Company is created to supervise oil operators.	
1973	December	The Lopez family is compelled to sell their controlling stock of MERALCO to a company controlled by Imelda Marcos' brother Kokoy Romualdez, as part of a deal to get Eugenio "Geny" Lopez Jr. released from detention. Geny is not released from detention.	
1974	February 2	DWGT-TV, now People's Television, is established	
1974	February 4–11	The Municipality of Jolo is destroyed in the Battle of Jolo, between government forces and the recently founded Moro National Liberation Front.	
1974	March 11	Japanese Lt. Hiroo Onoda formally surrenders in a ceremony held in Malacañang Palace after staying for years in the Lubang Island.	
1974	March 19	Jaime Sin is installed as Archbishop of Manila after the death of the more conservative Cardinal Rufino Santos. Sin formally becomes a member of the College of Cardinals on 24 May of the same year.	
1974	June 24	The Marcos administration takes up a US$17 million loan from Kuwait	
1974	July 21	The 23rd Miss Universe Pageant, in 1974, is held in Imelda Marcos' project, the specially constructed Folk Arts Theater in Manila. The Marcoses entertain the candidates at their lavishly constructed summer resthouse in Olot, Leyte.	
1974	August 5	The Philippine Constabulary starts training the Civilian Home Defense Forces with 36,000 trainees; the first in a projected 180,000-strong force.	
1974	August 24	Jesuit Sacred Heart Novitiate in Novaliches is raided by the military, who are allegedly searching for Jose Maria Sison. Jesuit Rev. Jose Blanco is arrested as a suspected rebel.	
1974	August 28	The Marcos administration takes up a US$51.3 million loan from the Asian Development Bank to develop metro manila water supply system - the bank's biggest loan ever at the time.	
1974	August 29	Marcos orders the release of Rev. Blanco and 13 students.	
1974	September 11	Political prisoners are arbitrarily released in celebration of Ferdinand Marcos' birth day, including high profile prisoners Senator Jose Diokno, former WWII Guerilla leader Eleuterio Adevoso, Benjamin Guingona, Antolin Oreta Jr. and Angel Baking.	
1974	September 21	Marcos issues Presidential Decree 557, changing the name of Philippine neighborhoods from "barrio" to "barangay" which was the terminology in use prior to American rule.	
1974	September 20–29	First Lady Imelda Marcos visits People's Republic of China, meeting Chairman Mao, Premier Zhou Enlai and Vice-Chairman and Vice-Premier Deng Xiaoping, paving the way for eventual normalization of relations.	
1974	September 17	Supreme Court upholds the declaration of martial law and dismisses petitions for habeas corpus.	
1974	September 20	Marcos stages a press conference, beamed worldwide via satellite, in which he defends Martial Law and denies media censorship having political prisoners.	
1974	October 11	Secretary-general Felicisimo Macapagal of the Partido Komunista ng Pilipinas (the Communist Party of the Philippines' predecessor) signs a memorandum of cooperation with the Marcos administration.	
1974	October 15	Marcos instructs the National Power Corporation to find new areas for the proposed Kalinga dams.	
1974	October 20	The Marcos administration takes up a US$125 million loan from the International Monetary Fund so that it can import oil.	
1974	November 11	Marcos signs Presidential Decrees 576 and 576-A, abolishing the Media Advisory Council and authorizing the creation regulatory bodies for broadcast and print media, the basis for the creation of the Kapisanan ng mga Brodkaster ng Pilipinas and the Philippine Council for Print Media.	
1974	November 20	Eugenio Lopez, Jr. and Sergio Osmena III stage a hunger strike while in prison to protest their detention.	
1974	December 1	Jose Sison's essay entitled Specific Characteristics of Our People's War published	
1974	December 24	A classified wire revealing the so-called Rolex 12 is submitted by the American Embassy in Manila to the Secretary of State in Washington, D.C.	
1975	January 6	Presidential Decree 633 creates the National Commission on the Role of Filipino Women (NCRFW), and Imelda is made its head	
1975	February 20	Media Advisory Council chair and Marcos propagandist Primitivo Mijares defects from the government.	
1975	February 27–28	The Philippine executive and legislative powers referendum of 1975 is held, with the supposed results allowing Marcos to restructure local government and allowing Martial Law to continue.	
1975	April 4	Ninoy Aquino starts his hunger strike and refuses to recognize military court's jurisdiction on charges against him.	
1975	April 15	Presidential Decree 684 creates the Kabataang Barangay, and President Marcos' daughter Imee Marcos becomes the first Kabataang Barangay chairperson.	
1975	June 9	Diplomatic relations with People's Republic of China are formalized.	
1975	June 17	Primitivo Mijares testifies in the U.S. Congress on the alleged corruption and abuses of the government.	
1975	September 20	Teenager Ernest Lucas dies after being shot in an altercation with Juan Ponce Enrile's son Jackie Enrile	
1975	October 2	The Thrilla in Manila Heavyweight World Championship boxing match between Muhammad Ali and Joe Frazier is held at the Araneta Coliseum in Cubao, Quezon City.	
1975	October 24	The 1975 La Tondeña strike, because it wasn't against a company claimed as a "critical industry," becomes the first major labor protest to take place after the declaration of Martial Law.	
1975	November 3	Presidential Decree 823 bans all strikes regardless of industry, and prohibits foreigners from participating in local trade unionism	
1975	November 7	Presidential Decree 824 creates Metropolitan Manila and appoints Imelda Marcos as governor.	
1976	January 4	New people's Army Spokesman Satur Ocampo arrested	
1976	April 7	The National Arts Center is inaugurated on Mount Makiling; National Artist Nick Joaquin uses the occasion to recount the story of Maria Makiling, who got angry at those who felled trees on her mountain, effectively lambasting the Marcoses for the showcase NAC project, which cost US$12 million.	
1976	April 27	Primitivo Mijares' book The Conjugal Dictatorship of Ferdinand and Imelda Marcos is published.	
1976	July	Lt. Victor Corpuz is captured.	
1976	August 17	An earthquake of 7.8 magnitude and a following tsunami (flood wave) hits the Moro Gulf in Mindanao, killing an estimated 8,000 people on and off the coast.	
1976	August 26	Bernabe Buscayno (Kumander Dante) of the New People's Army is arrested in Pampanga	
1976	September 3	Government begins demolitions in Tondo in preparation for the upcoming Annual meeting of boards of governors of World Bank and International Monetary Fund; over 400 families are displacedby the time the meeting happens in October.	
1976	October 4–8	The Annual meeting of boards of governors of World Bank and International Monetary Fund is held in the Philippine International Convention Center.	
1976	October 16	Martial Law allowed to extend through the Philippine constitutional referendum of 1976.	
1976	November 12	An economic mission, which includes First Lady Imelda Marcos and Secretary Vicente Paterno, departs for Libya.	
1976	December 23	With Libya as a mediator, the MNLF and the Philippine government sign the Tripoli Agreement, which would have established an autonomous region that included Basilan, Sulu, Palawan, and other areas in the southern Philippines, dividing authority over such fields as foreign policy, defense, education, courts, and finances between the Philippine government and the proposed autonomous government. Ferdinand Marcos submits the ratification of the agreement to a referendum, rather than issue an executive order as the MNLF wanted.	
1977	January 20	The Armed Forces of the Philippines enters into a ceasefire agreement with the MNLF.	
1977	January 20	Jimmy Carter, who had lambasted Marcos' human records during the campaign, is inaugurated as President of the United States. However, US support for the Marcos regime continues to flow into the Philippines throughout the Carter Administration.	
1977	March 26	President Marcos signs Proclamation 1628 established a provisional autonomous government in the 13 provinces stipulated in the Tripoli Agreement.	
1977	April 17	A plebiscite on autonomy is conducted in the 13 provinces. The creation of one autonomous region is overwhelmingly rejected, and two separate regional governments are created instead: one for Region IX and one for Region XII. The provinces of Davao del Sur, South Cotabato, and Palawan opting for exclusion from autonomy altogether.	
1977	May 31	The body of Luis Manuel "Boyet" Mijares, the 16 year old son of Primitivo Mijares, is found in Antipolo, Rizal, Boyet had been tortured, killed, and allegedly dumped from a helicopter onto the garbage dump where he was found.	
1977	August	Pres. Marcos announces amnesty for persons found guilty of subversion.	
1977	August 22	Imposition of curfew hours lifted	
1977	August 31	Mapua Institute of Technology student Archimedes Trajano attends an Open Forum at the Pamantasan ng Lungsod ng Maynila where presidential daughter and Kabataang Barangay chair Imee Marcos is speaker. He asks, "Must the Kabataang Barangay be headed by the president's daughter? She would not have gotten the position if she weren't the daughter of the president." Imee Marcos is allegedly irritated, and Trajano is forcibly thrown out of the open forum, blindfolded, and then beaten by Marcos' bodyguards.	
1977	September 2	Archimedes Trajano is found dead with signs of beating and torture apparent and his body and face severely mangled.	
1977	October 1	Eugenio Lopez, Jr. and Sergio Osmeña III escape from detention in Fort Bonifacio and flee to the United States.	
1977	October 10	In the Patikul Massacre, Brigadier General Teodulfo Bautista, and 32 men of the 1st Infantry Division are killed by MNLF Forces under Usman Sali in Patikul, Sulu	
1977	November 10	CPP head Jose Maria Sison is arrested	
1977	November 25	The military court finds Ninoy Aquino, Bernabe Buscayno and Victor Corpuz guilty of their charges and sentences them to death by firing squad; but sentence never imposed.	
1977	November 24	President Marcos accuses former president Diosdado Macapagal of aiding communist forces in Central Luzon, in response to Macapagal's anti-Martial Law stance.	
1977	December 16	A referendum is held, the result of which again empowers the president to continue in office, and concurrently become prime minister.	
1978	April 7	Members of the Interim Batasang Pambansa are elected in the Philippine parliamentary election of 1978. The KBL, including Imelda Marcos, win all 21 seats in Metro Manila, and 187 seats nationwide.	
1978	May 2	U.S. Vice President Walter Mondale visits the Philippines.	
1978	June 12	Inauguration of Interim Batasang Pambansa with Pres. Marcos as its prime minister.	
1979	January	U.S. military bases agreement amended in return for a US$500 million aid package.	
1979	March 25	23,000 Filipino civilian employees go on strike in the various US Bases in the Philippines, the third such major labor strike in the US bases, after two instances in 1971,	
1979	May 7	Regional Legislative Assembly elections are held in the Zamboanga Peninsula Region and former Region XII (now Soccsksargen).	
1979	May–June	The United Nations Conference on Trade and Development is held in the Philippine International Convention Center.	
1979	November 12	Construction of a nuclear-power plant in Bataan is ordered to be stopped.	
1979	December 24	The military arrests members of the middle class resistance group Light-a-Fire Movement are arrested, including Ester Paredes Jimenez, future senator Heherson Alvarez, and Asian Institute of Management Professor Eduardo Olaguer.	
1980	January 30	The 1980 Philippine local elections are held - the first under the martial law era.	
1980	May 1	The Kilusang Mayo Uno (KMU) is organized	
1980	May 8	After Senator Benigno Aquino suffers a serious heart attack in prison, the Marcos administration, wary of the PR risk should the risky surgery done at the Philippine Heart Center and fail, allows Senator Benigno Aquino to seek treatment in the United States.	
1980	May 13	Senator Benigno Aquino undergoes Heart Bypass Surgery at Baylor University Medical Center in Dallas, Texas.	
1980	June 20	Opposition figures Eva Kalaw, Raul Manglapus, and 20 others are charged with subversion.	
1980	October 8	Presidential Decree 727, making unlawful "the malicious dissemination of false information," is issued.	
1980	November 4	Ronald Reagan, whom the Marcoses considered a personal friend, wins the United States presidential election of 1980.	
1980	December	Imelda Marcos flies to New York, holding meetings "on neutral ground" at her suite at the Waldorf Astoria with leaders of the opposition overseas, including Senator Aquino, and with President Elect Ronald Reagan, who tells Imelda Marcos that it would be good if [Ferdinand] "Marcos could get a fresh mandate from the people." Imelda informs Reagan that Marcos would lift the proclamation of Martial Law.	
1980	December 4	Eva Kalaw and Ernesto Rendon are arrested, only to be released 5 days later.	
1980	December 20–22	Marcos grants amnesty to more than two thousand prisoners in preparation for the lifting of the Martial Law edict	
1981	January	Construction of the Coconut Palace is completed in time for the visit of Pope John Paul.	
1981	January 16	The day before the lifting of martial law, Marcos issues Presidential Decree No. 1791, which gives immunity from court action to civilian or military officials acting on the basis of the Martial Law edict. The act also gives immunity to officials following orders from the president after martial law is lifted.	

== "Fourth Republic" period (January 1981 – February 1986) ==
Year	Date	Event	Source
1981	January 17	Marcos issues Proclamation 2045 which formally lifts the proclamation of Martial Law in time for Pope John Paul II's visit and Reagan's inauguration, but retains many of his powers. Amendment Six to the 1973 constitution allows him to continue making laws, and the decrees issued during Martial Law are carried forward after its lifting. He also retains the right to suspend the writ of habeas corpus for "crimes related to subversion, insurrection, rebellion, and also conspiracy to commit such crimes."	
1981	January 20	Ronald Reagan, who had promised warmer relations with the Philippines than the US had under the Carter administration, is inaugurated.	
1981	February 17–21	Pope John Paul II makes his first visit to the Philippines. He declares in a speech that "Even in exceptional situations that may at times arise, one can never justify any violation of the fundamental dignity of the human person or of the basic rights that safeguard this dignity."	
1981	April 7	The Philippine constitutional referendum of 1981 amends the Constitution, giving more powers to the president and creating the Executive Committee on succession, new accreditation of political parties, etc.	
1981	May 11	Various opposition parties which had decided as early as April to boycott the upcoming elections, meet in Baguio to launch a civil disobedience campaign, urging people "not to vote in the presidential election."	
1981	June 1	Seattle-based Filipino American labor activists Gene Viernes and Silme Domingo are murdered at their offices in Pioneer Square in downtown Seattle. The murders are originally thought to be an isolated act of violence, but a 1989 federal jury eventually determined that Philippine President Ferdinand Marcos and his wife Imelda had ordered the murders in retaliation for the victims' anti-Marcos organizing.	
1981	June 16	Ferdinand Marcos is re-elected to a third term as a result of the Philippine presidential election and referendum of 1981	
1981	June 30	The "New Republic" under the 1973 constitution is inaugurated; Marcos is sworn in for the third time as president, and Finance Minister Cesar Virata is elected prime minister by the Batasang Pambansa	
1981	November 17	The sixth floor of the Manila Film Center collapses, killing a number of workers. Conflicting reports arose about the exact number of casualties. An urban legend later cites a figure 168 workers, with the project supervisor Betty Benitez becoming the 169th victim after her death in a freak car accident a few months later.	
1982	January	Sportsman Tommy Manotoc is abducted and "rescued" by the government agents.	
1982	January	The Manila International Film Festival is held in the Manila Film Center, which had been finished so recently that the concrete had reportedly not dried properly yet.	
1982	April	The United Nationalist Democratic Organization (UNIDO) is formed.	
1982	May	The first Philippine barangay election is held.	
1982	July 23	Armed Forces of the Philippines officers Gregorio Honasan, Victor Batac, and Eduardo Kapunan form the Reform the Armed Forces Movement	
1982	August 2	We Forum, a triweekly paper established in 1976, runs a story exposing Marcos' alleged World War II medals as "fake."	
1982	September 1	Labor leaders including Felixberto Olalia Sr. and Crispin Beltran of the KMU are arrested.	
1982	September 14	Pres. Marcos leaves for a State Visit to the United States, to speak to President Reagan.	
1982	September 17	Presidents Marcos and Reagan speak in the white house, with the US bases in the Philippines as a major issue.	
1982	September 19	The World Bank approves a US$77 million loan for three more energy projects.	
1982	December 7	Newspapers We Forum and Malaya are shut down by the President for engaging in "black propaganda." We Forum editor Joe Burgos is arrested.	
1982	December 8	69 year old Manila Times publisher Chino Roces is also arrested, but is released the following day on house arrest	
1982	December 25	Opposition leaders Ribomapil Holganza Sr. and Ramon Alberca are arrested.	
1983	April 17	Cagayan de Oro Mayor Aquilino Pimentel Jr. is arrested via a Presidential Commitment Order	
1983	August 21	Benigno Aquino Jr. is assassinated at then Manila International Airport.	
1983	August 31	Approximately seven million people attend the funeral procession of Ninoy Aquino.	
1983	September 21	The opposition commemorates the anniversary of Martial Law as a National Day of Sorrow to mark Aquino's assassination.	
1983	November 21	Martyrdom of Good Shepherd Sisters	
1983	December	The Marcos administration prepares an ad intended for placement in the New York Times and other major international dailies, exonerating Ferdinand Marcos for the Aquino Assassination. When asked to sign it, Foreign Minister Carlos P. Romulo instead resigns, citing ill health. Romulo goes into retirement "heartsick" over the assassination of Aquino, whom he considered a "friend", and over the resulting freefall of the Philippines' economy and international reputation.	
1984	January 27	Executive Committee is abolished and the Office of the Vice President is restored through a constitutional amendment as ratified in a plebiscite.	
1984	February 5	"Tarlac to Tarmac" march is staged by opposition and coalition groups.	
1984	May 14	1984 Philippine parliamentary election	
1984	July	National Assembly covenes; Prime Minister Virata reconfirmed; Nicanor Yniguez elected Speaker.	
1984	September 15	Teofisto Guingona Jr. accuses the marcos regime of diverting half of the country's $26 billion debt to private enterprises, and demands a review of Bataan Nuclear Power Plant	
1984	September 27	The September 1984 Welcome Rotonda protest dispersal turns violent; student leader and future UP Diliman chancellor Fidel Nemenzo is shot in the kidney and nearly killed; photographs of 80-year-old former senator Lorenzo Tanada and 71-year old Manila Times founder Chino Roces facing water cannons become iconic of the administration's use of excessive force.	
1984	November 14	Mayor Cesar Climaco assassinated	
1984	December 1	Manila LRT Line 1 opened.	
1985	April 11	Fr. Tullio Favali is murdered by paramilitary forces, making him the first foreign missionary martyred during Martial Law. His death caused international attention to human rights violations and abuses to paramilitary forces during the Marcos dictatorship.	
1985	July	Pres. Marcos transfers the control of the Integrated National Police from Defense Ministry to the presidential control.	
1985	August	Opposition Parliament members file impeachment charges against Pres. Marcos.	
1985	September 20	A massacre in Escalante, Negros Occidental kills at least 20 people.	
1985	October 21	Marchers joining the five-day Lakbayan rally are shot by the police at Taft Avenue before reaching Liwasang Bonifacio, leaving a number of deaths.	
1985	October 28	Congressional and U.S. intelligence sources report that Pres. Marcos was diagnosed with a fatal illness.	
1985	November 3	Pres. Marcos announces in a television interview that he would set snap elections.	
1985	December 2	AFP Chief of Staff Gen. Fabian Ver and 26 others accused of the assassination of Ninoy Aquino are acquitted by Sandiganbayan.	
1985	December 9	The Philippine Daily Inquirer is founded and publishes its first issue.	
1985	December 15	Death of Carlos Romulo	
1986	February 7	1986 Philippine presidential election	
1986	February 9	Thirty-five COMELEC computer workers led by Linda Kapunan walk out at PICC, protesting alleged cheating of election results.	
1986	February 11	Opposition Antique former Gov. Evelio Javier is assassinated during the canvassing of election results.	
1986	February 15	Batasang Pambansa declares Marcos and Arturo Tolentino as re-elected president and elected vice-president, respectively. Twenty-six Assembly members walk out before the proclamation.	
1986	February 16	Marcos' opponent Corazon Aquino, widow of Benigno Aquino Jr., is proclaimed president in Tagumpay ng Bayan rally in Rizal Park and calls for a civil disobedience campaign as a protest.	
1986	February 22–25	EDSA Revolution ousts Pres. Marcos; Corazon Cojuangco–Aquino becomes president.: February 22 – Defense Minister Juan Ponce Enrile and Constabulary Chief Gen. Fidel Ramos withdraw from the Marcos administration. Crowd gathered outside Camp Crame. The crowd at EDSA consisted of approximately 1,500 people.; February 23 – People flock to camps Crame and Aguinaldo, and Ortigas Avenue and EDSA, to join with Enrile and Ramos and express support for Cojuangco–Aquino as the real new president. The crowd at EDSA grew to approximately 50,000 people.; February 25 – Cojuangco–Aquino is sworn in as president by Senior Associate Justice Claudio Teehankee, and Salvador Laurel as vice-president by Justice Vicente Abad Santos, at Club Filipino in San Juan. Aquino appoints Enrile as defense secretary and Ramos as AFP chief of staff. Marcos also holds his own inauguration, however at evening, he and his family are transported by helicopters to Clark Air Base.	
1986	February 26	From Clark Air Base, Marcoses finally leave the country aboard U.S. planes to Guam and to Hawaii.	
1986	February 28	Presidential Commission on Good Government (PCGG) is formed by Pres. Aquino.	
1986	March 25	Pres. Aquino declares a revolutionary government, abolishes Interim Batasang Pambansa and the 1973 Constitution and adopts Freedom Constitution (Proclamation No. 3).	
1986	March 25	After initial representations from the new Philippine government, the Swiss authorities freeze Marcos assets in Switzerland.	
1986	May 28	Marcos crony Jose Yao Campos signs a compromise agreement with the PCGG, returns over PHP250 million in cash, and identifies 197 corporations and properties - worth about PHP2.5 billion—which he was supposedly holding on behalf of the Marcos Family—more assets than the PCGG had actually known about based on the documents they had recovered in Malacañang palace after the Marcoses left. The deal with Yao is the first compromise settlement entered into by the PCGG.	
1986	July 22	DZMM of ABS–CBN is established as the first post-revolution AM radio station.	
1986	July 22	DWKO established as the first post-revolution FM radio station.	
1986	July 28	The Philippine Star publishes its first issue.	
1986	August 21	Bantayog ng mga Bayani founded	
1986	September 13	The Mount Data Peace Accord is signed between the Philippine Government and the separatist Cordillera Bodong Administration-Cordillera People's Liberation Army.	
1986	September 14	ABS–CBN resumes its broadcast.	
1986	November 13	KMU chairman Rolando Olalia was shot dead in Antipolo, Rizal.	
1986	December	By the close of 1986, the PCGG had filed "39 civil cases for the recovery, reconveyance, reversion, accounting, and damages against the Marcoses and their cronies"[sic]	

== See also ==
- Timeline of Philippine History
