= List of elections in 1979 =

The following elections occurred in the year 1979.

== Africa ==
- Algeria: presidential election
- Benin: parliamentary election
- Botswana: general election
- Congo:
  - parliamentary election
  - constitutional referendum
- Egypt: parliamentary election
- Gabon: presidential election
- Ghana: presidential election
- Kenya: general election
- Mali: general election
- Nigeria:
  - parliamentary election
  - presidential election
- Ghana: general election
- Rhodesia: constitutional referendum
- Seychelles: general election
- Somali:
  - parliamentary election
  - constitutional referendum
- South Africa: presidential election
- Togo:
  - general election
  - constitutional referendum
- Tunisia: general election
- Zimbabwe Rhodesia general election

== Asia ==
- 1979 Bangladeshi general election
- 1979 Egyptian parliamentary election
- 1979 North Korean local elections
- 1979 South Korean presidential election
- India:
  - 1979 Indian vice presidential election
  - 1979 Indian Rajya Sabha elections
  - 1979 Nagapattinam by-election
- Iran:
  - 1979 Iranian Constitutional Assembly election
  - March 1979 Iranian Islamic Republic referendum
  - December 1979 Iranian constitutional referendum
- Japan: general election
- Mindanao: 1979 Sangguniang Pampook elections
- Philippines: 1979 Sangguniang Pampook elections
- Singapore: 1979 Singaporean by-elections
- Soviet Union: 1979 Soviet Union legislative election
- Thailand: 1979 Thai general election

== Australia ==
- 1979 Australian Capital Territory election
- 1979 Grayndler by-election
- 1979 Norwood state by-election
- 1979 South Australian state election
- 1979 Tasmanian state election
- 1979 Victorian state election

== Europe ==
=== Austria ===
- 1979 Austrian legislative election

=== Denmark ===
- 1979 Danish parliamentary election

=== European Parliament ===
- 1979 European Parliament election
  - in Belgium
  - in Denmark
  - in France
  - in Greenland
  - in Ireland
  - in Italy
    - in Sardinia
    - in Veneto
  - in Luxembourg
  - in the Netherlands
  - in the United Kingdom
  - in West Germany

=== Finland ===
- 1979 Finnish parliamentary election
- 1979 Ålandic legislative election

=== France ===
- 1979 European Parliament election in France
- 1979 French cantonal elections

=== Germany ===
- 1979 West German presidential election
- 1979 European Parliament election in West Germany
- 1979 Rhineland-Palatinate state election
- 1979 West Berlin state election

=== Iceland ===
- 1979 Icelandic parliamentary election

=== Ireland ===
- 1979 Irish local elections
- 1979 Fianna Fáil leadership election

=== Italy ===
- 1979 European Parliament election in Italy
- 1979 Italian general election

=== Luxembourg ===
- 1979 Luxembourg general election

=== Norway ===
- 1979 Norwegian local elections

=== Portugal ===
- 1979 Portuguese legislative election
- 1979 Portuguese local elections

=== Spain ===
- 1979 Spanish general election
- 1979 Spanish local elections

=== Sweden ===
- 1979 Swedish general election
- 1979 Stockholm municipal election

=== Switzerland ===
- 1979 Swiss federal election

=== United Kingdom ===
- 1979 United Kingdom general election
  - England: 1979 United Kingdom general election in England
  - Scotland: 1979 United Kingdom general election in Scotland
  - Wales: 1979 United Kingdom general election in Wales
  - Northern Ireland: 1979 United Kingdom general election in Northern Ireland
  - List of MPs elected in the 1979 United Kingdom general election
- 1979 Clitheroe by-election
- 1979 European Parliament election in the United Kingdom
- 1979 South West Hertfordshire by-election
- 1979 Knutsford by-election
- 1979 Liverpool Edge Hill by-election
- 1979 Manchester Central by-election
- 1979 Scottish devolution referendum
- 1979 Ulster Unionist Party leadership election

==== United Kingdom local ====
- 1979 United Kingdom local elections

===== English local =====
- 1979 Manchester Council election
- 1979 Trafford Council election
- 1979 Wolverhampton Council election

== North America ==
- 1979 Belizean legislative election
- 1979 Greenlandic general election
- 1979 Haitian parliamentary election
- 1979 Mexican legislative election
- 1979 Saint Lucian general election
- 1979 Vincentian general election

=== Canada ===
- 1979 Canadian federal election
- 1979 Alberta general election
- 1979 British Columbia general election
- 1979 Edmonton municipal plebiscite
- 1979 Newfoundland general election
- 1979 Northwest Territories general election
- 1979 Prince Edward Island general election

=== United States ===
- 1979 United States elections

==== United States lieutenant gubernatorial ====
- 1979 Kentucky lieutenant gubernatorial election
- 1979 Louisiana lieutenant gubernatorial election

==== United States gubernatorial ====
- 1979 Kentucky gubernatorial election
- 1979 Louisiana gubernatorial election
- 1979 Mississippi gubernatorial election
- 1979 United States gubernatorial elections

==== United States House of Representatives ====
- 1979 United States House of Representatives elections

==== United States mayoral elections ====
- 1979 Baltimore mayoral election
- 1979 Boston mayoral election
- 1979 Burlington mayoral election
- 1979 Chicago mayoral election
- 1979 Cleveland mayoral election
- 1979 Durham mayoral election
- 1979 Evansville mayoral election
- 1979 Hartford mayoral election
- 1979 Indianapolis mayoral election
- 1979 Manchester, New Hampshire, mayoral election
- 1979 Philadelphia mayoral election
- 1979 San Diego mayoral election
- 1979 San Francisco mayoral election
- 1979 Sioux Falls mayoral election
- 1979 South Bend mayoral election
- 1979 Springfield, Massachusetts mayoral election
- 1979 Tampa mayoral election

== Oceania ==
- 1979 Christchurch Central by-election
- 1979 Marshallese constitutional referendum
- 1979 Western Samoan general election

=== Australia ===
- 1979 Australian Capital Territory election
- 1979 Grayndler by-election
- 1979 Norwood state by-election
- 1979 South Australian state election
- 1979 Tasmanian state election
- 1979 Victorian state election
