= 1970 in the Philippines =

- Decades: 1950s; 1960s; 1970s; 1980s; 1990s
- See also: List of years in the Philippines; films

1970 in the Philippines details events of note that happened in the Philippines in the year 1970.

== Incumbents ==
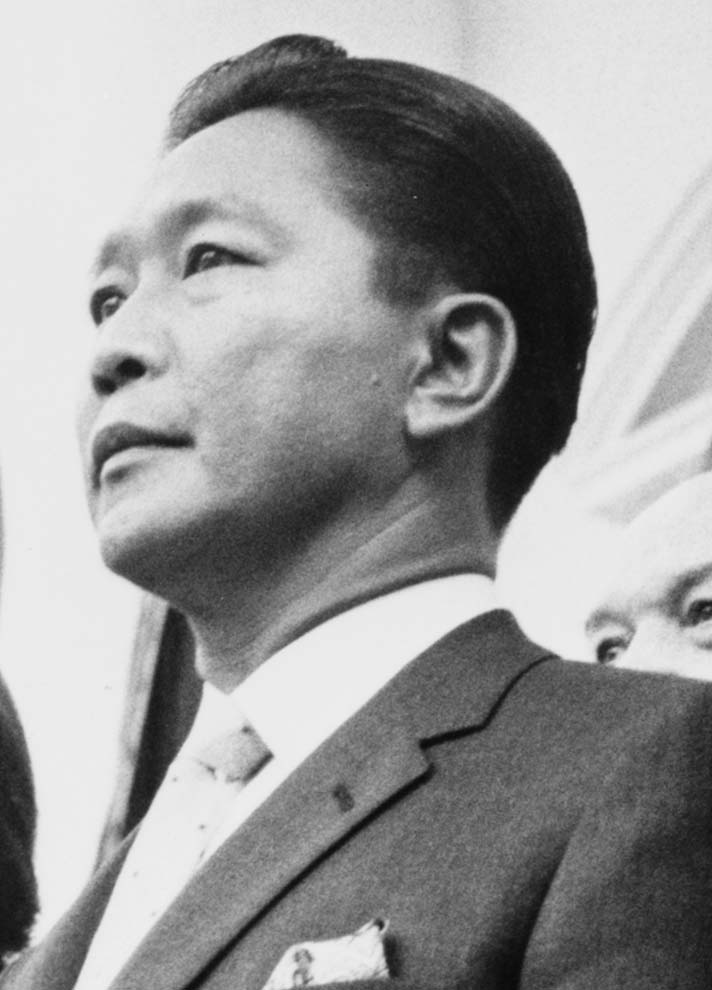
President Ferdinand Marcos at the White House in 1966.

- President: Ferdinand Marcos (Nacionalista Party)
- Vice President: Fernando Lopez (Nacionalista Party)
- House Speaker: José Laurel, Jr.
- Chief Justice: Roberto Concepcion
- Congress: 7th (starting January 26)

== Events ==
=== January ===
- January to March – The First Quarter Storm was a period of leftist unrest in the Philippines, composed of a series of heavy demonstrations, protests, and marches against the government.
- January 26 – Pres. Marcos delivers his State of the Nation Address at the Legislative Building, Manila. Student groups, led by the National Union of Students of the Philippines and Kabataang Makabayan, conducts a rally outside the building, in which, are confronted by the riot police as they march to Malacañang, leaving many injuries.
- January 30 – Another confrontation between riot police and about 2,000 demonstrators, mostly students, outside Malacañang Palace, kills six people in what would be called the "Battle of Mendiola," and marks the beginning of the First Quarter Storm.

=== February ===
- February 10 – President Marcos issues a moratorium on executions pending a study by Congress on the death penalty. Such general reprieve to all convicts will be lifted in early 1972.
- February 18 – United States Embassy in Manila is attacked by an estimated 2,000-3,000 youths, who had broken from a massive peaceful demonstrations, after holding a People's Congress in Plaza Miranda.

=== March ===
- March 3 – A People's March is organized by the Movement for a Democratic Philippines, and the group marches from Welcome Rotonda in Quezon City to Post Office Building in Plaza Lawton, Manila.

=== April ===
- April 5 – 7 – Demonstrations and strikes against oil price and transportation cost increases, and violent anti-American riots break out.
- April 7 – Destructive earthquake shook the Manila area, killed 15 persons and injured 200 others.
- April 21 – Philippine twin-engine Hawker Siddeley, ripped by an explosion in the tail section, fell near the village of Pantabangan, Nueva Ecija, all 36 aboard died.

=== May ===
- May 20 – Another protest actions against Marcos government and the involvement of United States in Vietnam War are held.

=== June ===
- June 12 – Philippine fishing boat "Baby Princess" capsized in a violent storm 300 miles southwest of Manila, 22 persons were rescued, 22 others were devoured by sharks.

=== October ===
- October 13 – Super Typhoon Sening landfalls on Lagonoy Gulf with sustained winds of 280 km/h. Sening left over 80,000 people homeless, in addition to killing 575 people (193 people were unaccounted for, and have since been declared dead, bringing the total toll to 768) and injuring nearly 1600. US$74 million (1970 US$, $373 million 2005 USD) of damage was estimated.

=== November ===
- November 10 – A nationwide election is held for 320 delegates—representing all the legislative districts—among 2,482 candidates, of the Constitutional Convention, which will meet to revise the Commonwealth-era (1935) Constitution.
- November 19 – Philippine military officials denied charges made by Senator Stuart Symington (Democratic; Missouri) that the United States had provided cash assistance to the Philippine contingent in Vietnam.
- November 20 – Violent typhoon (Typhoon Patsy or Yoling) with winds of (more than) 125 mph raged through the heavily populated (Luzon) island, wrecking the harbor and airport facilities at Manila. Typhoon Patsy was one of the deadliest typhoons to strike the Philippines in its history. 611 people were killed (with 351 missing) on the island, and 135 people were killed at sea due to shipping failures. In Manila, 120 persons died, 60 others were missing, and more than 1,000 injured; property damage reached $80 million.
- November 27–29 – Papal visit of Pope Paul VI, the country's first. Upon his arrival at Manila International Airport, he survived an assassination attempt by a Bolivian painter, Benjamin Mendoza (a knife-wielding assailant dressed as a priest).

=== December ===
- December 29 – The New People's Army conducts a raid in the armory of the Philippine Military Academy, with Lt. Victor Corpuz, academy's constabulary officer, as its accomplice.

== Holidays ==
As per Act No. 2711 section 29, issued on March 10, 1917, any legal holiday of fixed date falls on Sunday, the next succeeding day shall be observed as legal holiday. Sundays are also considered legal religious holidays. Bonifacio Day was added through Philippine Legislature Act No. 2946. It was signed by then-Governor General Francis Burton Harrison in 1921. On October 28, 1931, the Act No. 3827 was approved declaring the last Sunday of August as National Heroes Day. As per Republic Act No. 3022, April 9 is proclaimed as Bataan Day. Independence Day was changed from July 4 (Philippine Republic Day) to June 12 (Philippine Independence Day) on August 4, 1964.

- January 1 – New Year's Day
- February 22 – Legal Holiday
- March 27 – Maundy Thursday
- March 28 – Good Friday
- April 9 – Araw ng Kagitingan (Day of Valor)
- May 1 – Labor Day
- June 12 – Independence Day
- July 4 – Philippine Republic Day
- August 13 – Legal Holiday
- August 30 – National Heroes Day
- November 26 – Thanksgiving Day
- November 30 – Bonifacio Day
- December 25 – Christmas Day
- December 30 – Rizal Day

== Entertainment and culture ==
- June 1 - NewsWatch, the longest-running newscast premiered on KBS-9 (now RPN-9 until 2012).

=== Unknown ===
- Sesame Street, premiered on KBS-9 (now RPN-9 until 1980).

== Sports ==
- August 24 – September 4 – The country participated in the 1970 Asian Games held in Bangkok, Thailand. It ranked 11th with 1 gold medal, 9 silver medals and 12 bronze medals with a total of 22 over-all medals.

== Births ==
- January 2 – Ogie Diaz, actor, comedian, and talent manager
- January 5 – Mitoy Yonting, singer and comedian
- January 8 – Bentot Jr., actor (died 2016)
- January 11 – Joy Nilo, composer
- January 12 – Mig Ayesa, Filipino-Australian singer and actor
- January 21 - Nanette Medved, actress and philanthropist
- January 23 – Ronald Moreno, judge
- January 28:
  - Norman Fegidero, football player
- February 1:
  - Albert Garcia, politician
  - Michael Teruel, olympian
- February 14 – John Carlos de los Reyes, politician
- February 25 – Maricel Laxa, actress
- March 2 – Strike Revilla, politician
- March 6 – Gretchen Barretto, actress
- March 15 – Joy Belmonte, politician
- March 20 – Josephine Medina, table tennis player (died 2021)
- March 21 – Jaya, Filipino soul music, singer, rapper, dancer, record producer, TV host, and actress
- March 27 – E.J. Feihl, basketball player
- March 30 – Isidro Vicera, boxer
- April 3 – Ace Durano, politician
- April 6 – Angelica Amante, politician
- April 9 – Bing Loyzaga, actress and singer
- April 12 – Eric Buhain, competitive swimmer
- April 16 – Angelica Amante, politician
- April 17 – Carlo Katigbak, president and CEO of ABS-CBN Corporation
- April 22 – Regine Velasquez, singer and actress
- May 1 – Cristina Gonzales, actress and politician
- May 2 – Warren Kiamco, professional pool player
- May 4 – Monique Wilson, actress and women's rights activist
- May 6 – Dennis Pineda, politician
- May 15:
  - Elias Bulut Jr., politician
  - Elias Recaido, boxer
- May 23 - Mr. DJ. Martin D., Disc Jockey Voice Over and Host (died 2026)
- May 27 – Cherry Pie Picache, actress
- May 30 – Manolo Quezon, writer and host
- June 6 – Johnedel Cardel, professional basketball player
- June 10 – Alex Santos, journalist
- June 11 – Pinky Webb, TV newscaster
- June 25 – Chokoleit, comedian (died 2019)
- July 3 – Niel Tupas Jr., lawyer and politician
- July 17 – Johnny Abarrientos, basketball player
- July 20 – Anjanette Abayari, actress
- July 30 – Ferdinand Pascual, basketball referee
- July 31 – Robert Angelo, professional ootennis player
- August 2 – Marcelino Teodoro, politician
- August 6 – Rex Andrew Alarcon, Bishop of Daet
- August 7 – Gerardo Espina Jr., politician
- August 27 – Pokwang, comedian
- August 30 – Ricor Buaron, basketball referee
- September 5 – Gilbert Remulla, journalist and politician
- September 15 – Pedro Centeno Baquero, Roman Catholic bishop
- September 24 – Keanna Reeves, comedian
- October 2 – Adel Tamano, educator, lawyer and politician
- October 5 – Geraldine Ecleo-Villaroman, politician
- October 28 – Alan Peter Cayetano, politician, diplomat, and Speaker of the House of Representatives
- October 30 – Christine Bersola-Babao, host
- October 31 - Romano Vasquez, actor
- November 1 – Olsen Racela, basketball player
- November 2 – Ely Buendia, vocalist of Eraserheads
- November 21 – Karen Davila, TV newscaster
- November 24 – Tonisito Umali, lawyer
- November 25 – Vince Hizon, basketball player
- December 8 – Zaldy Co, businessman and former Ako Bicol Partylist representative
- December 26 – Antonio Lascuña, professional golfer

== Deaths ==
- January 2 – Boni Serrano, soldier
- January 19 – Honoria Acosta-Sison, first female Filipino doctor
- January 26 – Basilio J. Valdes, Spanish-Filipino doctor, general, and minister
- March 24 – Amado V. Hernandez, writer and labor leader
- March 26 – Sulpicio Osório, editor, poet and writer
- April 20 – Antonio Abad, poet and playwright
- April 21 – José Corazón de Jesús Jr., actor
- June 23 – Fortunato Yambao, basketball player
- July 18 – Basilio L. Sarmiento, poet
- August 11:
  - Carlos Camins, politician
  - Leon C. Pichay, writer and poet
  - Rudy Robles, actor
- September 8 – Mariano Castañeda, 5th Chief of Staff of the Armed Forces of the Philippines
- October 18 – Manuel A. Cuenco, physician and politician
- December 22 – Vicente Gullas, writer, lawyer and educator
