= 1979 Sioux Falls mayoral election =

- April 10, 1979

Candidate	Rick Knobe	Clint Clark	Richard Barnes
Party	Nonpartisan	Nonpartisan	Nonpartisan
Popular vote	10,022	3,043	1,784
Percentage	64.40%	19.56%	11.46%
Mayor before election
Rick Knobe
Nonpartisan
Elected mayor
Rick Knobe
Nonpartisan

The 1979 Sioux Falls mayoral election took place on April 10, 1979. Incumbent Mayor Rick Knobe ran for re-election to a second term. He was challenged by four opponents, including racquet club owner Clint Clark and former State Representative Richard Barnes. Knobe won 64 percent of the vote, avoiding the need for a runoff election.

== Candidates ==
- Rick Knobe, incumbent Mayor
- Clint Clark, owner of the Wood Lake Racquet Club
- Richard Barnes, former State Representative
- Robert Quinn, attorney
- Joe Birkenheuer, retired teacher

== Results ==
1979 Sioux Falls mayoral election
Party	Candidate	Votes	%
Nonpartisan	Rick Knobe (inc.)	10,022	64.40%
Nonpartisan	Clint Clark	3,043	19.56%
Nonpartisan	Richard Barnes	1,784	11.46%
Nonpartisan	Robert Quinn	381	2.45%
Nonpartisan	Joe Birkenheuer	331	2.13%
Total votes		15,561	100.00%
