= Ester Paredes Jimenez =

Filipina activist (1916–1997)

Ester Dolores Erquiaga Misa Paredes Jimenez (April 14, 1916 – September 4, 1997) was a Filipina activist best known for her contributions to the resistance against the dictatorship of former Philippine president Ferdinand Marcos.

== Activism ==
Already a widow when Martial law was declared, Jimenez began providing aid to anti-dictatorship activists when her youngest child decided to drop out of college and join the underground movement against Marcos. She was known as neither ideologue nor political leader, but acting on her conscience, she decided to actively fight the dictatorship by joining other middle class professionals in the urban guerrilla group known as the Light-A-Fire Movement, along with her second husband Othoniel Jimenez.

Jimenez, her husband, and other members of the group were caught by Marcos forces in December 1979, although she was released before the other members of the group, in 1981. A military court later sentenced the members of group, including her and her husband, in December 1984. However, the dictatorship never had an opportunity to carry the sentence out. In 1986 People Power Revolution deposed the Marcoses and forced them into exile, and the Supreme Court nullified the death sentences, ruling that a military court had no business imposing sanctions on civilians.

== Death ==
Ester Paredes Jimenez died at age 81 in 1997, after a prolonged illness.

== Trivia ==
She was the mother of Apo Hiking Society member Jim Paredes.

== See also ==
- Martial law under Ferdinand Marcos
- Timeline of the Marcos dictatorship
