= 1979 People's Republic of the Congo parliamentary election =

Parliamentary elections were held in the People's Republic of the Congo on 8 July 1979 alongside a constitutional referendum. The country was a one-party state at the time, with the Congolese Party of Labour as the sole legal party. As such, it won all 153 seats in the enlarged People's National Assembly, with a voter turnout of 90%.

Only 153 candidates were put forward for the election, of which 69 were party representatives, 36 were from mass organisations, 20 represented regions and Brazzaville, 18 were workers, and 10 were members of the armed forces.

== Results ==
Party	Votes	%	Seats	+/–
Congolese Party of Labour	725,981	100.00	153	+38
Total	725,981	100.00	153	+38
Valid votes	725,981	97.31		
Invalid/blank votes	20,101	2.69		
Total votes	746,082	100.00		
Registered voters/turnout	826,193	90.30		
Source: Inter-Parliamentary Union
