= Light-A-Fire Movement =

1970s Filipino guerrilla resistance group

The Light-A-Fire Movement (often referred to as the "LAFM", "L-A-F", or "L-A-F Movmement") was a small guerrilla resistance group that fought against the martial law regime of Ferdinand Marcos in the Philippines. The group engaged in symbolic acts of sabotage targeting offices and businesses associated with Marcos, aiming to inspire other Filipinos to rise up against his rule. The LAFM is notable for being the first armed anti-Marcos group aligned with the pre-martial law political center, rather than with movements on the extreme left or right.

Members of this group spent the early years of martial law, from 1972 to 1978, opposing Marcos through diplomacy and negotiation. However, political suppression and widely recognized election fraud during the 1978 Philippine parliamentary election convinced them that Marcos would never willingly permit the emergence of a genuine, viable political opposition.

The group's strategy involved staging small but attention-grabbing explosions and fires in establishments owned by known "Marcos cronies." They also sent nonlethal letter bombs intended to shock Marcos' technocrats into withdrawing their support for the administration. Their goal was to show that resistance to Marcos existed, challenging his propaganda narrative that his regime was stable. Though they had limited success locally, due to Marcos' control over domestic media, they managed to attract international media attention, which added to the growing global pressure on the regime to end martial law.

The group was short-lived; its key members were captured in December 1979, only a year after its formation. After the core members of the Light-A-Fire Movement were imprisoned, a more skilled guerrilla group called the April 6 Liberation Movement took up the LAFM's cause and tactics. This shift contributed to pressure from the United States, which ultimately led Marcos to nominally end martial law in January 1981.

Despite this victory, Marcos remained in power, retaining his ability to rule by decree and order warrantless arrests. He continued to do so for five more years until he was finally deposed in the civilian-led People Power Revolution. The members of the Light-A-Fire Movement were subsequently either freed from Marcos' prisons or returned from exile. They then resumed their pre-martial law roles in government and the business sector.

== Background ==
Barred from running for a third term as president in 1973, Philippine President Ferdinand Marcos declared martial law on September 23, 1972, citing civil unrest following the 1969 Philippine balance of payments crisis as justification. Through this decree, Marcos seized emergency powers, giving him full control over the military and authority to suppress freedom of speech and of the press, as well as other civil liberties. He dissolved the Philippine Congress and shut down media establishments critical of his administration. He also ordered the immediate arrest of political opponents and critics, including key opposition senators Jose W. Diokno, Benigno Aquino Jr., Jovito Salonga, and Raul Manglapus. With nearly all his political opponents arrested, in hiding, or exiled, Marcos would ultimately hold onto power for 14 years beyond his first two presidential terms.

This period in Philippine history is remembered for the Marcos administration's record of human rights abuses, particularly against political opponents, student activists, journalists, religious workers, farmers, and others who resisted the dictatorship. Based on documentation from Amnesty International, Task Force Detainees of the Philippines, and similar human rights monitoring groups, historians estimate that the Marcos dictatorship was marked by 3,257 known extrajudicial killings, 35,000 cases of documented torture, 759 disappearances, and 70,000 incarcerations. After Marcos was ousted, government investigators discovered that martial law had also enabled the Marcoses to conceal vast stashes of unexplained wealth, which various courts later determined to be "of criminal origin."

== Formation ==
The idea of waging an armed resistance against the Marcos dictatorship was not new when the Light-A-Fire Movement was formed in 1978. By that time, an armed leftist resistance led by the New People's Army and a Muslim Separatist conflict led by the Moro National Liberation Front (and later the Moro Islamic Liberation Front) had been ongoing for years. However, Filipinos who identified as politically "centrist" and wished to avoid aligning with either the extreme left or right generally favored unarmed resistance strategies. For those who could leave the Philippines, this meant lobbying and diplomacy in liberal Western legislatures; those who remained in the Philippines documented the Marcos dictatorship's abuses for exposure to the international community. In both cases, their goal was to counter Marcos' propaganda, which portrayed the implementation of martial law as peaceful and lawful.

In the wake of the 1978 Philippine parliamentary election, however, some anti-Marcos activists in exile in the United States realized that Marcos' propaganda machine and suppressive political tactics were so effective at concealing his abuses that it would be impossible to force him to restore democracy through diplomatic means alone.

During that election, Marcos did not allow opposition parties to organize properly, and when the results were announced, they were widely believed to be fraudulent. Former U.S. President Jimmy Carter even remarked that "Marcos stole the election."

Nevertheless, these anti-Marcos activists drew inspiration from the noise barrage organized by the opposition on April 6, 1978—the night before the election—which provided a rare opportunity for ordinary citizens to express their protest against the repression of the Marcos regime. Taking their cue from the success of the noise barrage, they believed that if centrist moderate Filipinos saw individuals with mainstream political views willing to take action against the regime, they would soon rise up against Marcos and force him to abolish martial law.

Among those known to be involved in the LAFM were Business Day publisher Eduardo Olaguer, his friends Othoniel and Ester Paredes Jimenez, Asian Institute of Management professor Gaston Ortigas, and Filipino-American businessman Ben Lim—all of whom were later tried by the Marcos regime for their alleged membership in the group. Some individuals said to have supported the group financially include Rizal Commercial Banking Corporation Chairman Alfonso Yuchengco, industrialists Vicente Puyat and J. Amado Araneta, and former Senator Oscar Ledesma.

== 1978-1979 "Acts of Sabotage" ==
In the months between its formation in 1978 and its effective dissolution in December 1979, the Light-A-Fire Movement implemented several small-scale "acts of sabotage," the most prominent of which included a fire at the Floating Manila Bay Casino, which had been operating since 1977, and a bombing at the former offices of the Commission on Elections, a symbol of the electoral fraud widely believed to have plagued the April 1978 elections. They also caused property damage to several luxury hotels owned by "Marcos cronies." Additionally, they sent a small non-fatal letter bomb intended to scare Education Minister Onofre Corpuz. None of these attacks resulted in casualties, as the group confined itself to the "legitimate use of force" while upholding Catholic precepts against killing. Although more potent and lethal attacks occurred shortly after the LAFM became inactive, these were the work of other groups.

The attacks received little media coverage in the Philippines because Marcos still controlled reporting, one of his powers under martial law. However, as international pressure groups lobbied Western countries to take action against Marcos, the incidents succeeded in attracting attention from both international media and diplomatic circles. They effectively disproved Marcos' claims of broad national support in the Philippines and put pressure on the regime to finally end martial law.

== 1979 Capture by Marcos ==
Ultimately, the LAFM was short-lived, as its members were captured by the Marcos regime in December 1979, only a year after the group's formation and seven years before the Philippines would finally oust Marcos in the civilian-led People Power Revolution.

The Marcos regime's first major success against the group occurred when one of its members, after being stopped by customs while traveling to and from the Philippines, shared some details about the group with U.S. Customs officials, believing that the U.S. would support their cause. Instead, the U.S. passed the information to the Marcos regime. Soon after, in December 1979, LAFM member Ben Lim was caught with explosives and LAFM documents at Manila International Airport, leading to the arrest of sixteen group members. Mindful of potential backlash from arresting respected figures, the Marcos regime chose not to file charges against a Jesuit priest and various businessmen implicated by the documents.

After the core members of the Light-A-Fire Movement were imprisoned, a different, better-trained guerrilla group called the April 6 Liberation Movement took up the LAFM's cause and tactics. This shift led the United States to pressure Marcos into nominally ending the formal state of martial law in January 1981.

== After the People Power Revolution ==
Despite the nominal lifting of martial law, Marcos remained in power, retaining his ability to rule by decree and order warrantless arrests. He continued to do so for five more years until he was finally deposed in the civilian-led People Power Revolution. The members of the Light-A-Fire Movement were subsequently either freed from Marcos' prisons or returned from exile. They then resumed their pre-martial law roles in government and the business sector.
