= 1967 in the Philippines =

- Decades: 1940s; 1950s; 1960s; 1970s; 1980s
- See also: List of years in the Philippines; films

1967 in the Philippines details events of note that happened in the Philippines in 1967.

== Incumbents ==
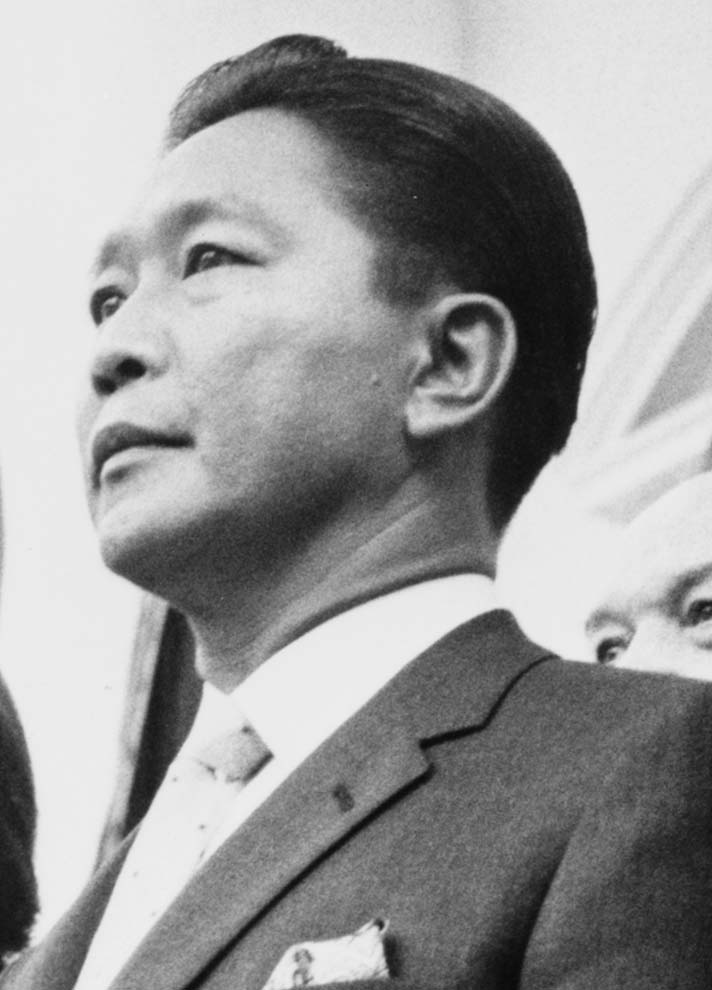
President Ferdinand Marcos at the White House in 1966.

- President: Ferdinand Marcos (Nacionalista Party)
- Vice President: Fernando Lopez (Nacionalista Party)
- House Speaker: José Laurel, Jr.
- Chief Justice: Roberto Concepcion
- Congress: 6th

== Events ==
=== January ===
- January 6 – Two pilgrimage buses fall into a ravine in Indang, Cavite, killing more than 84 passengers.

=== April ===
- April 7 – The Philippine Educational Theater Association (PETA) is established by Cecile Guidote-Alvarez.

=== May ===
- May 8 – The province of Davao is dissolved after splitting into three provinces. The provinces of Davao del Norte, Davao del Sur, and Davao Oriental are established.

=== June ===
- June 17:
  - The municipality of Quirino, in the province of Isabela is established through the enacted Republic Act No. 4901.
  - The provinces of Agusan del Norte and Agusan del Sur are created through the enacted Republic Act No. 4979. The province of Agusan is dissolved after the division.

=== July ===
- July 2 – Canlaon becomes a city in the province of Negros Occidental through Republic Act 3445 and by virtue of Proclamation No. 193.

=== August ===
- August 8 – Association of Southeast Asian Nation (ASEAN) is formed after the country's foreign minister, along with four other countries, signed the ASEAN Declaration.
- August 16 – Taal Volcano experiences another phreatomagmatic eruption, originating from Mount Tabaro, further indicating heightened volcanic activity during this period.

=== November ===
- November 14 – An election is held for 8 seats in the Senate.

=== Unknown date ===
- March – The Repertory Philippines is established by five actors: Zenaida Amador, Carmen Barredo, Leo Martinez, Tony Mercado, and Monina Mercado.

== Holidays ==
As per Act No. 2711 section 29, issued on March 10, 1917, any legal holiday of fixed date falls on Sunday, the next succeeding day shall be observed as legal holiday. Sundays are also considered legal religious holidays. Bonifacio Day was added through Philippine Legislature Act No. 2946. It was signed by then-Governor General Francis Burton Harrison in 1921. On October 28, 1931, the Act No. 3827 was approved declaring the last Sunday of August as National Heroes Day. As per Republic Act No. 3022, April 9 is proclaimed as Bataan Day. Independence Day was changed from July 4 (Philippine Republic Day) to June 12 (Philippine Independence Day) on August 4, 1964.

- January 1 – New Year's Day
- February 22 – Legal Holiday
- March 23 – Maundy Thursday
- March 24 – Good Friday
- April 9 – Araw ng Kagitingan (Day of Valor)
- May 1 – Labor Day
- June 12 – Independence Day
- July 4 – Philippine Republic Day
- August 13 – Legal Holiday
- August 27 – National Heroes Day
- November 23 – Thanksgiving Day
- November 30 – Bonifacio Day
- December 25 – Christmas Day
- December 30 – Rizal Day

== Births ==
- January 2 – Rose Fostanes, Caregiver, and Singer
- January 6 – Kim Atienza, TV host, actor, voice actor and weather anchor
- January 14 – Elma Muros, athlete
- January 20 – Eric Quizon, actor, director, producer and writer
- January 25 – Nelson Asaytono, basketball player
- February 7 – Fernando Suarez, Catholic priest (d. 2020)
- February 10 – Armand Serrano, animator
- February 12 – Ambet Nabus, comedian and journalist
- February 28 – Roman Romulo, politician
- March 5 – Joel Virador, human rights activist
- March 10 – Pia Hontiveros, media personality
- March 27 – Liezl Martinez, actress (d. 2015)
- April 23 – Geraldine Roman, journalist and politician
- April 30 – Christine Jacob, swimmer, actress, TV host, and newscaster
- May 14 – Carlos Isagani Zarate, politician, lawyer, and activist
- May 18 – Richard Yap, Chinese-Filipino actor and businessman
- May 19 – Pablo John Garcia, politician
- June 6 - Jordan Lim, Real Estate Broker
- June 26 – Luisito Espinosa, boxer
- July 6 - Doc Nielsen Donato, host
- July 19 – Vincent Garcia, politician
- July 23 - Chino Trinidad, sports journalist (d. 2024)
- July 24 – Eugene Torres, businessman
- July 30:
  - Andrew E, actor, rapper, and comedian
  - Roel Cortez, singer-songwriter (d. 2015)
- August 15, Bayani Casimiro Jr., actor and comedian (d. 2025)
- August 18 – Mark Meily, Film Director, and TV Commercial Director
- August 22 – Zaldy Ampatuan, Politician
- August 27 – Ogie Alcasid, singer-songwriter, comedian, parodist, and actor
- September 2 – Ricky Carandang, News Anchor
- September 4 – BB Gandanghari, transgender actress, model, entertainer, comedienne, and director
- September 5 – Arnel Pineda, Filipino singer-songwriter
- September 12 - John Regala, Filipino actor (d. 2023)
- September 15 – Raymond Bagatsing, actor and model
- September 16 – Yayo Aguila, Actress
- September 19 - Dan Andrew Cura, president and CEO of FEBC Philippines
- October 11 – Daniel Razon, television, radio host, and singer
- October 24 – Juanito Victor Remulla, politician
- November 6 – Bong Hawkins basketball player
- November 2 – Jenny Syquia, model, actress, and fashion designer
- November 21 – Toby Tiangco, legislator, businessman and politician
- November 30 – Bonel Balingit, Basketball player and actor
- December 31 – Vic Villacorta, animator, Illustrator

== Deaths ==
- February 20 – James Leonard Gordon, Filipino politician. (born 1917)
- April 12 – Emilio S. Liwanag, officer in the Philippine Navy. (born 1911)
- November 19 – Arsenio Laurel, Race Car driver (born 1931)
