= 1968 in the Philippines =

- Decades: 1940s; 1950s; 1960s; 1970s; 1980s
- See also: List of years in the Philippines; films

1968 in the Philippines details events of note that happened in the Philippines in 1968.

== Incumbents ==
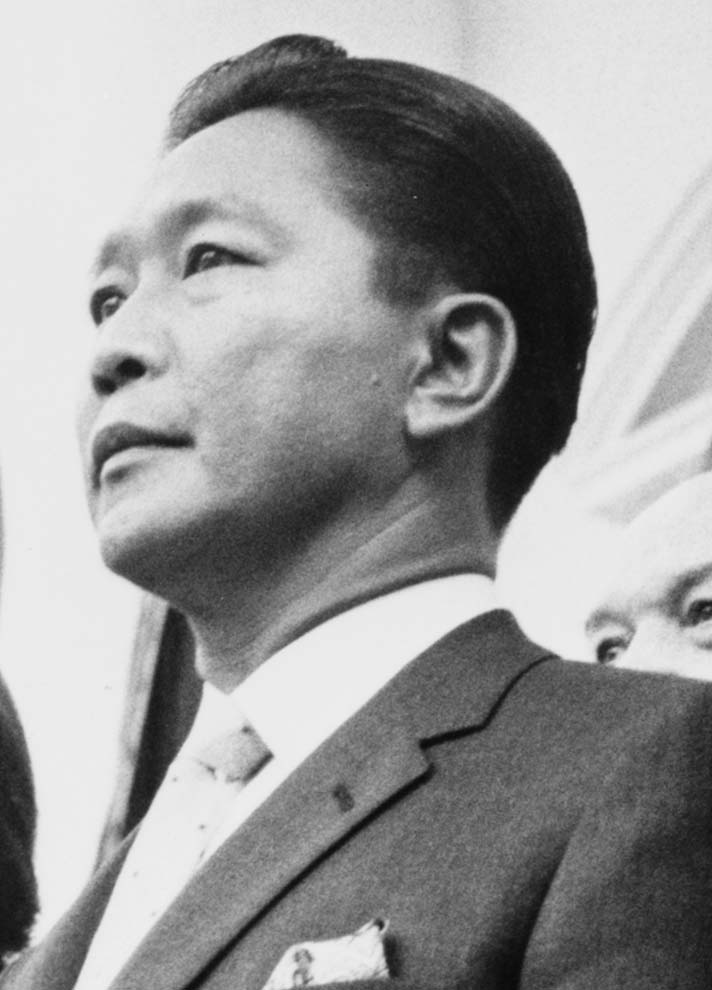
President Ferdinand Marcos at the White House in 1966.

- President: Ferdinand Marcos (Nacionalista Party)
- Vice President: Fernando Lopez (Nacionalista Party)
- House Speaker: José Laurel, Jr.
- Chief Justice: Roberto Concepcion
- Congress: 6th

== Events ==
=== March ===
- March 18 – Jabidah massacre takes place when Army soldiers murdered a number of Moro recruits through machine gunfire in Corregidor Island in retaliation to the planned invasion of Sabah.

=== August ===
- August 2 – The 1968 Casiguran earthquake occurred with a moment magnitude of 7.6 and a maximum Mercalli intensity of IX (Violent). The earthquake's epicenter was located in Casiguran, Aurora. This was deemed the most destructive earthquake in the Philippines prior to the 1990 Luzon earthquake.

=== September ===
- September 18 – The Republic Act No. 5446 takes effect which regards Sabah as part of the Philippines.

=== December ===
- December 26 – The CPP is founded under the guidance of Marxism-Leninism-Maoism by Joma Sison.

== Holidays ==
As per Act No. 2711 section 29, issued on March 10, 1917, any legal holiday of fixed date falls on Sunday, the next succeeding day shall be observed as legal holiday. Sundays are also considered legal religious holidays. Bonifacio Day was added through Philippine Legislature Act No. 2946. It was signed by then-Governor General Francis Burton Harrison in 1921. On October 28, 1931, the Act No. 3827 was approved declaring the last Sunday of August as National Heroes Day. As per Republic Act No. 3022, April 9th is proclaimed as Bataan Day. Independence Day was changed from July 4 (Philippine Republic Day) to June 12 (Philippine Independence Day) on August 4, 1964.

- January 1 – New Year's Day
- February 22 – Legal Holiday
- April 9 – Araw ng Kagitingan (Day of Valor)
- April 11 – Maundy Thursday
- April 12 – Good Friday
- May 1 – Labor Day
- June 12 – Independence Day
- July 4 – Philippine Republic Day
- August 13 – Legal Holiday
- August 25 – National Heroes Day
- November 21 – Thanksgiving Day
- November 30 – Bonifacio Day
- December 25 – Christmas Day
- December 30 – Rizal Day

== Entertainment and culture ==
- December 18 – ABS-CBN opens its present-day headquarters, the ABS-CBN Broadcasting Center on Bohol Avenue (renamed as Sgt. Esguerra Avenue in 1989), Quezon City, the most advanced broadcast facility in the country during that time.

== Sports ==
- October 12–27 – The Philippines participates in the 1968 Summer Olympics with 49 competitors in ten sports.

== Births ==
- January 20 – Gerry Alanguilan, comic book author (d. 2019)
- March 1:
  - Mon Confiado, actor
  - Nelson Legacion, politician
- March 3 – Edwin Ongchuan, Filipino politician
- April 13 – Lani Mercado-Revilla, actress and incumbent Mayor of Bacoor
- April 23 – Migz Zubiri, Filipino Representative and senator
- April 24 – Anjo Yllana, actor, comedian, TV host and politician
- May 6 – Joyce Bernal, film and television director
- May 12 – Herbert Bautista, actor, and mayor of Quezon City
- May 21 – Julie Vega, child actress and singer (d. 1985)
- June 3 – Luis Raymund Villafuerte, politician
- June 15 – Paul Alvarez, basketball player
- June 21 – Jett Pangan, singer
- June 29 – Robbie Guevara, actor, director, producer
- July 7 – Dingdong Avanzado, singer and actor
- July 15 – Julius Babao, anchor and journalist
- August 15 – Esmael Mangudadatu, politician
- August 30 – Caroline Tanchay, businesswoman
- September 3 – Grace Poe, senator and former chairwoman of MTRCB
- October 2 – Benjie Paras, basketball player, actor, and comedian
- November 9 – Janice de Belen, actress
- November 15 – Teodoro Casiño, journalist and politician
- November 20 – Princess Punzalan, actress
- December 11 – Eula Valdez, actress
- December 26 – John Feir, actor and comedian

== Deaths ==
- February 21 – Vicente Duterte, Filipino politician and lawyer, father of the 16th President of the Philippines, Rodrigo Duterte (b. 1911)
- February 11 – Efren Reyes, Sr., Filipino actor (b. 1924)
- May 8 – Telesforo Trinidad, Filipino fireman in the United States Navy and recipient of the Medal of Honor (b. 1890)
- September 20 – Higino A. Acala, Sr., Filipino lawyer (b. 1925)
