= 1966 in the Philippines =

- Decades: 1940s; 1950s; 1960s; 1970s; 1980s
- See also: List of years in the Philippines; films

1966 in the Philippines details events of note that happened in the Philippines in 1966.

== Incumbents ==
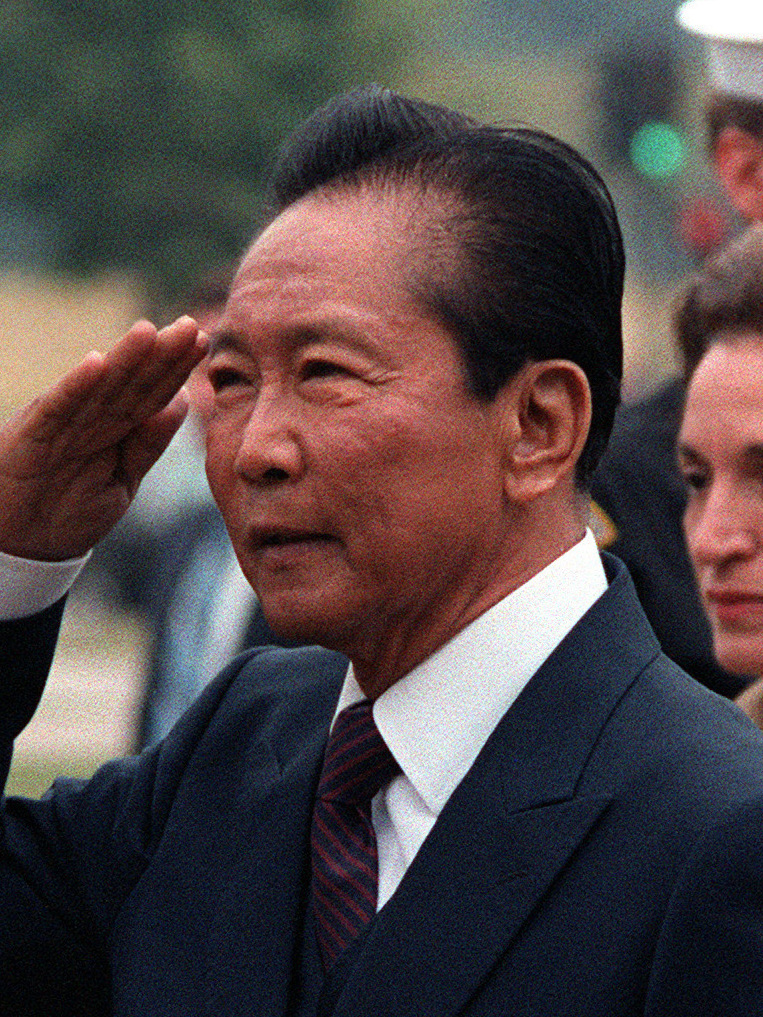
President Ferdinand Marcos

- President: Ferdinand Marcos (Nacionalista Party)
- Vice President: Fernando Lopez (Nacionalista Party)
- Chief Justice: César Bengzon
- Congress: 6th

== Events ==
=== January ===
- January 14 – In the current clean-up week contest conducted by the National Clean-up Week Committee, De La Salle College is adjudged the cleanest private school in the country.
- January 24 – President Ferdinand Marcos, in his emergency address to the country, says, "We are in crisis!"

=== June ===
- June 12 – Crowds gather for a military parade celebrating Philippine Independence Day as President Ferdinand Marcos, recently inaugurated, salutes his troops.

=== July ===
- July 5 – A moderate phreatomagmatic eruption at Mt. Tabaro results in tephra fallout and airborne projectiles, impacting the volcano island.

=== August ===
- August 16 – The national government begins the deployment of the Philippine Civic Action Group (PHILCAG) to South Vietnam, dispatching the first detachment of 100 men. This would be followed by other batches, reaching a total strength of 2,048 on October 19.

=== October ===
- October 24–25 – Manila Summit Conference for negotiated settlement over the Vietnam War is held. It is participated by seven nations—the Philippines, United States, Australia, New Zealand, South Korea, South Vietnam, and Thailand.

=== December ===
- December 31 – The country ranks 18th in the world with 33,704,749 population.

== Holidays ==
As per Act No. 2711 section 29, issued on March 10, 1917, any legal holiday of fixed date falls on Sunday, the next succeeding day shall be observed as legal holiday. Sundays are also considered legal religious holidays. Bonifacio Day was added through Philippine Legislature Act No. 2946. It was signed by then-Governor General Francis Burton Harrison in 1921. On October 28, 1931, the Act No. 3827 was approved declaring the last Sunday of August as National Heroes Day. As per Republic Act No. 3022, April 9 is proclaimed as Bataan Day. Independence Day was changed from July 4 (Philippine Republic Day) to June 12 (Philippine Independence Day) on August 4, 1964.

- January 1 – New Year's Day
- February 22 – Legal Holiday
- April 9 – Bataan Day
- April 7 – Maundy Thursday
- April 8 – Good Friday
- May 1 – Labor Day
- June 12 – Independence Day
- July 4 – Philippine Republic Day
- August 13 – Legal Holiday
- August 29 – National Heroes Day
- November 24 – Thanksgiving Day
- November 30 – Bonifacio Day
- December 25 – Christmas Day
- December 30 – Rizal Day

== Births ==
- January 6 - Sharon Cuneta-Pangilinan, Filipino actress, singer, and television personality
- January 10 - Ruby Rodriguez, Filipino actress
- January 14 - Dan Fernandez, Filipino politician, actor, businessman, and optometrist
- February 12 - Jose Manalo, Filipino actor, director, and comedian
- February 24 - Risa Hontiveros, Filipino politician, community leader, and journalist
- February 27 - Gary Ignacio, actor and singer (d. 2015)
- March 16 - Pinky Amador, Filipino actress, singer, commercial model and TV host
- March 22 - Pia Cayetano, Filipino politician, lawyer, economist, athlete, and television host
- April 4 - Snooky Serna, Filipino actress
- April 7 - Richard Gomez, Filipino actor, TV host, politician, and épée fencer
- May 24 - France Castro, Filipino educator, trade union activist, and politician
- May 31 - William Martinez, Filipino actor
- June 24 - John Arcilla, Filipino actor
- July 20 - Agot Isidro, Filipino actress and singer
- September 1 - Ariel Rivera, Filipino singer-songwriter and actor
- September 25 - Bong Revilla Jr., Filipino actor, director, producer, television presenter and politician
- November 1 - Winnie Cordero, Filipino comedian, actress and TV host
- November 28 - Nonie Buencamino, Filipino character actor known for his television and theater work
- December 7 - Timmy Cruz, Filipino singer and movie actress
- December 12 - Pops Fernandez, Filipino singer, entertainer, entrepreneur, TV host and actress
