= Richard Barnes (South Dakota politician) =

American politician (born 1941)

Member of the South Dakota House of Representatives
- In office 1973–1976

Personal details
- Born: May 16, 1941 (age 85)
- Party: Democratic
- Spouse: Judy
- Children: 2
- Education: Drake University; University of Chicago; Iowa State University; Northern State College; University of South Dakota

Richard Barnes (born May 16, 1941) is an American politician. He served as a Democratic member of the South Dakota House of Representatives.

== Life and career ==
Barnes attended Drake University, the University of Chicago, Iowa State University, Northern State College and the University of South Dakota.

Barnes served in the South Dakota House of Representatives from 1973 to 1976.
