= Basilio L. Sarmiento =

Filipino poet

Basilio L. Sarmiento (June 14, 1890, in Meycauayan, Bulacan – July 18, 1970) was a Filipino poet in the Tagalog language.

Basilio Sarmiento was born on June 14, 1890, in Banga, a barangay in Meycauayan in the Philippine province of Bulacan. He was the eldest of five children of Domingo Sarmiento and Engracia Latigar. His father was a fisherman while his mother was a market vendor. Sarmiento learned to read and write from his father. His secondary education, he studied at Malolos and Manila High School. From 1911 to 1913 he studied at the Philippine School of Commerce, where he learned typing and shorthand. After graduating from the Civil Service diploma, he worked from 1913 to 1928 as a clerk employed by the Bureau of Post. In 1928 Sarmiento earned an Associate of Arts diploma at the University of Manila.

Besides working for the Philippine government Sarmiento was also active as a writer. Between 1914 and 1916, he wrote for newspapers such as Taliba, Mithi and Ang Democracia. During this same period he also began writing poetry like his fellow contemporary Tagolog poets such as Deogracias Rosario. His first published poem was Kakilakilabot in Renacintiento in 1913, subsequently followed by many more poems and occasionally even some prose. Sarmiento's works appeared under the pseudonyms as Silahis, Basalisar, Bul. A. Can, and published in weekly magazines like Liwayway, Alitaptap, Sampaguita, Bulaklak, Ilang-Ilang and Tagumpay. Part of his poems appeared in a collection of poems, a book entitled Sagismsim. For this work he received in 1940 an honorary award at the Commonwealth Literary Contest.

Basilio Sarmiento died in 1970 at age 80. He was married to Inocencia Saldaña who bore seven of the eight Sarmiento children, which in turn has given Basilio with thirteen direct grand children.

(1) Virginia Sarmiento, (2) Ester Saldaña Sarmiento, (3) Rita Saldaña Sarmiento, (4) Lourdes Saldaña Sarmiento, (5) Josefina Saldaña Sarmiento, (6) Anna Saldaña Sarmiento, (7) Victor Saldaña Sarmiento, (8) Angela Saldaña Sarmiento,
