= 1967 Cavite bus crash =

Philippines' worst road accident

Details
- Date: January 6, 1967 (59 years ago)
- Location: Italaro, Kayquit, Indang, Cavite
- Coordinates: 14.155458°N 120.902411°E
- Country: Philippines
- Line: Batangas–Ternate, Cavite
- Operator: Batangas Laguna Tayabas Bus Company (BLTB Co.)
- Incident type: Collision and fall
- Cause: Human error or mechanical defect (faulty brakes)

Statistics
- Bus: 2
- Passengers: 130–300 (from both buses) (Note: Figures vary. See § Investigation.)
- Deaths: 81–115 (Note: The official death toll ranges from 81 to 84, and the count for the injured varies from 57 to 60. Other figures are estimates. See § Casualties.)
- Injured: 15–60
- Damage: 2 (both buses)

On January 6, 1967, two Catholic pilgrimage buses collided on a mountainous road near a reinforced timber bridge in the rural town of Indang, Cavite, Philippines. Subsequently, they plunged off a cliff, killing more than 80 people, the majority being women and children, and injuring the remaining passengers, making it one of the world's worst road accidents and disasters and the worst in Philippine history.

== Background ==
The Tuy–Indang segment (comprising Balayan–Tuy and Naic–Indang Roads) of the Batangas–Cavite Interprovincial Road was constructed from the 1920s to the 1930s by the United States government to establish a direct link from the Philippine capital, Manila, to western Batangas. Along the road was a timber bridge with steel reinforcements connecting then-barrio Italaro (now a sitio of Kayquit III) in Indang to the adjacent town of Mendez, both of which are separated by a river in the barrio's south. (Note: Explanatory notes from an undergraduate research paper: The drivers involved were Antonio Lontok (no. 522) and Lolito de Castro (no. 318). The source stated that de Castro survived the incident but did not provide information on Lontok's fate.; The paper reports that 81 passengers from both buses died on impact, with 58 sustaining serious injuries.; Additionally, the investigation revealed that the two buses each carried more than 140 passengers onboard.)

Two years prior to the incident, more than 40 people were killed at the same site. In 1965, two softdrink trailer trucks fell into the ravine. The following year, a crash killed at least nine people and injured 16 others. According to the Guinness Book of World Records, the worst road disaster prior to this incident took place in India five years earlier.

In December 1966, about three weeks before the incident, the Philippine government launched a nationwide safety campaign against the so-called "rolling coffins"—a term used to describe the buses—following an incident where a bus crashed into the gates of Malacañang Palace, the official residence of the president. In the provinces, bus rides were often compared to rollercoaster rides due to several drivers running their vehicles at expressway speeds.

== Crash ==
The buses involved were owned by Batangas Laguna Tayabas Bus Company (BLTB Co.) and were part of a convoy consisting of 57 buses that were carrying devotees from the towns of Nasugbu, Tuy, and Lian in Batangas to a church dedicated to the Santo Niño in the coastal town of Ternate, Cavite, to celebrate the annual feast of Epiphany.

At dawn on January 6, 1967, the convoy left from Batangas. Later in the morning, while traversing their route for Indang, the ninth bus (no. 522) lost its brakes while overtaking other vehicles, colliding with the back of the eighth bus (no. 318) upon reaching a curve near the Italaro Bridge. The impact of the collision caused the buses to fall off a 91-meter-deep (300 ft) ravine.

== Casualties ==
The Associated Press initially estimated more than 115 deaths and reported 15 survivors in the crash. After response operations, United Press International noted at least 84 deaths, with more than 60 others injured, including at least 30 in critical condition. Another source reported 83 deaths, 57 injuries, and three unaccounted for. All immediate deaths were attributed to bodies being struck by twisted steel reinforcements and tree branches in the area. Unclaimed bodies were taken to the Indang Health Center. Seventy-six of the dead passengers were identified, including a former mayor of Tuy. Among the injured, 48, including two bus conductors, were reportedly taken to various medical facilities in Cavite, while seven were transferred to the Philippine General Hospital in Manila.

== Response ==
Rescue and retrieval took a long time to reach the crash site due to its remoteness and rugged terrain. Ambulances were slowed down by mountainous roads, while Philippine Air Force and United States Navy helicopters that were dispatched from Naval Station Sangley Point in Cavite City arrived after nearly six hours when rescue operations were almost finished.

The injured, many of them in a critical condition, were brought to various hospitals in Cavite, while some were transferred to Manila due to lack of medicine supplies. As local governments requested, assistance from the Department of Health and other national government agencies, for the treatment to the victims, only came a day late, and the ambulances came in the early afternoon.

President Ferdinand Marcos deployed a team of doctors and social welfare workers to the hospitals where the survivors were taken. The Philippine Constabulary (PC) ordered the closure of the Batangas–Cavite Interprovincial Road to prevent looting of the wreckage.

== Reaction ==
On January 8, 1967, President Marcos, upon learning initial reports that the crash was due to either drivers' negligence or the buses' defective brakes, ordered the Public Service Commission to cancel the franchise of BLTB Co. if found liable, otherwise, to take other disciplinary actions against the company.

On January 11, Pope Paul VI extended his condolences and gave his paternal blessing to the families and relatives of the victims through a cable released by Archbishop Carlo Martini, the apostolic nuncio to the Philippines, to the press.

== Aftermath ==
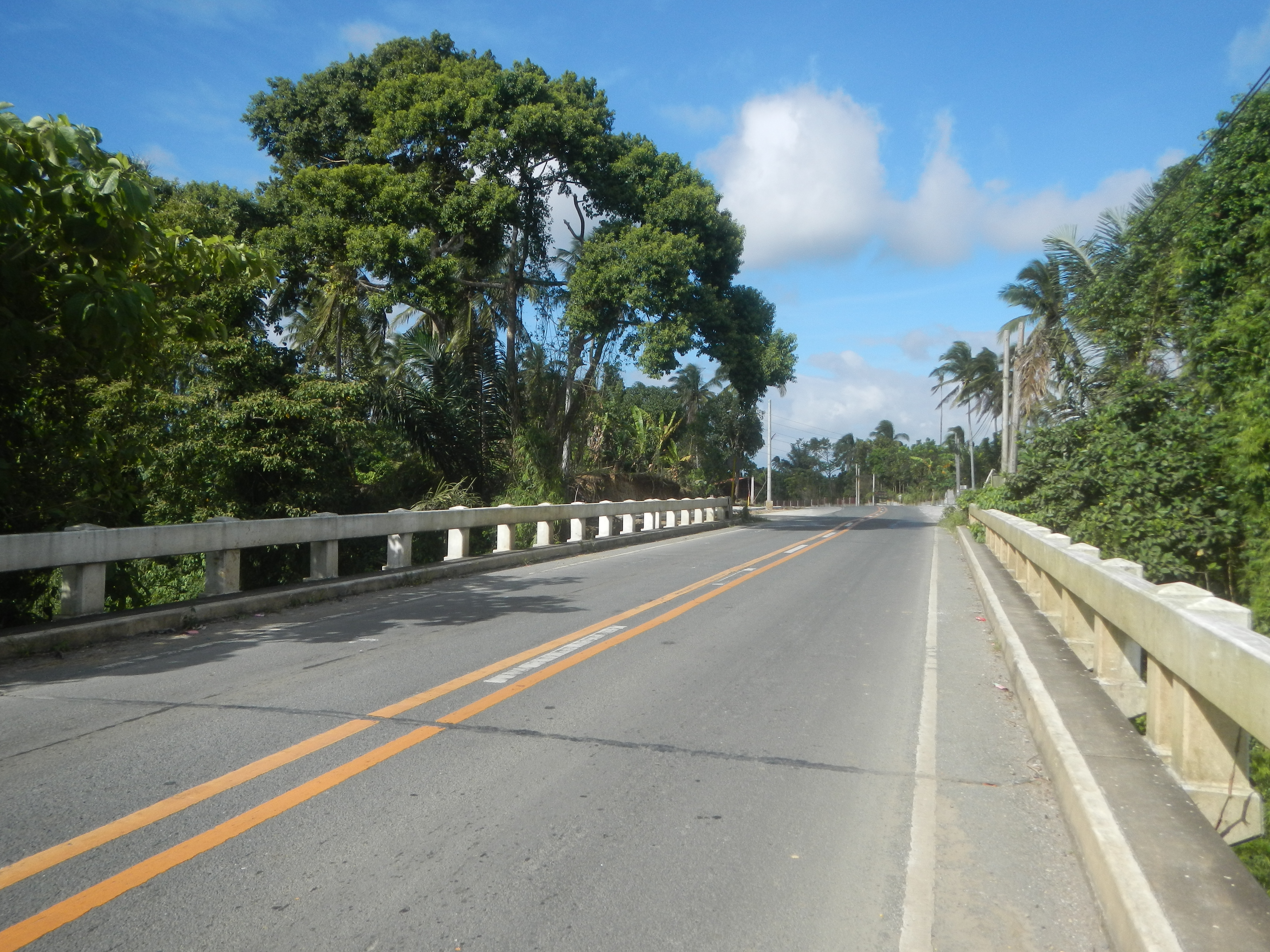
The replacement bridge in December 2018 (to the left is the crash site)

After the crash, it was said that apparently, the government and the Department of Public Works and Highways (DPWH) intentionally abandoned the section of the road leading to the crash site to realign it elsewhere, allowing vegetation to reclaim it. The road was slightly realigned to the east and a new bridge was built with it.

== Investigation ==
There are conflicting reports on the number of passengers. While some sources suggest that there were more than 130, it was reported that nearly 300 people, mostly Catholic pilgrims, have been aboard the two buses, with about 150 people on each.

According to preliminary reports, mechanical defect and negligence were the primary cause of the crash.

Lolito de Castro of Batangas, the driver of bus no. 318, was arrested at a clinic in the province where he was treated. An investigation led by Col. Rizalino Garcia, Cavite PC Commander, revealed that de Castro jumped out of the bus as he was unable to control it, and, as admitted by de Castro, later went into hiding in fear of retaliation from victims' relatives. Charges of "multiple homicide" and "multiple physical injuries through reckless imprudence" were filed against him.
