= 1979 Stockholm municipal election =

Swedish local election

The Stockholm municipal election of 1979 was held on 16 September 1979 concurrently with the 1979 Swedish parliamentary election. This election used a party-list proportional representation system to allocate the 101 seats of the Stockholm City Council (Stockholms stadsfullmäktige) amongst the various Swedish political parties. Voter turnout was 86.4%.

The Stockholm Party was founded in this year, and was allocated three seats in this election, marking the first time a party entered or exited the Stockholm City Council since the Centre Party earned their first mandate in 1966.

== Results ==
Party	Votes			Seats	
Party	#	%	+ –	#	+ –
Social Democrats; Socialdemokraterna (s)	172,990	37.4%	-1.8%	39	–1
Moderate Party; Moderata samlingspartiet (m)	134,024	29.0%	+4.1%	31	+4
People's Party; Folkpartiet (fp)	47,546	10.3%	-3.0%	12	–1
Left Party Communists; Vänsterpartiet kommunisterna (v)	44,744	9.7%	+0.8%	10	+1
Centre Party; Centerpartiet (c)	34,395	7.4%	-4.0%	6	–6
Christian Democratic; Kristdemokratiska samhällspartiet (kd)	4,522	1.0%	±0.0%	0	±0
Other parties	23,822	5.2%	+3.9%	3	+3
Total	462,043	100%	—	101	±0
Invalid ballots	3,153				

== See also ==
- Elections in Sweden
- List of political parties in Sweden
- City of Stockholm
