= 1969 in the Philippines =

- Decades: 1940s; 1950s; 1960s; 1970s; 1980s
- See also: List of years in the Philippines; films

1969 in the Philippines details events of note that happened in the Philippines in 1969.

== Incumbents ==
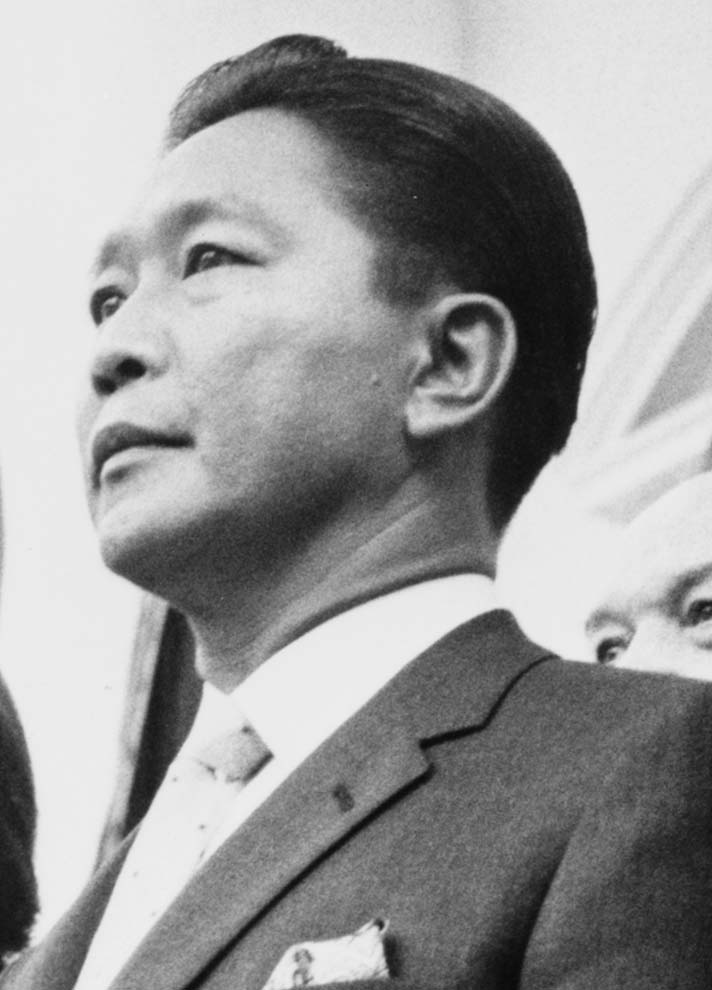
President Ferdinand Marcos at the White House in 1966.

- President: Ferdinand Marcos (Nacionalista Party)
- Vice President: Fernando Lopez (Nacionalista Party)
- House Speaker: José Laurel, Jr.
- Chief Justice: Roberto Concepcion
- Congress: 6th (until June 17)

== Events ==
=== March ===
- March 29 – The New People's Army is formed by merging of Jose Maria Sison's revolutionary band with Bernabe Buscayno's Huk's peasant's army.

=== May ===
- May 11 – Tuguegarao, Cagayan experiences a heatwave with a recorded temperature of 42.2 °C.

=== June ===
- June 21 – The province of Western Samar is renamed to Samar by virtue of Republic Act No. 5650.

=== July ===
- July 26 – United States President Richard Nixon visits the Philippines.

=== September ===
- September 12 – A Philippine Airlines plane hits a tree and crashes on a hill in Antipolo, Rizal, killing 45 of 47 people on board. It is then the country's second worst air accident.

=== October ===
- October 15 – TV station DZKB-TV Channel 9, owned by Roberto S. Benedicto, is launched.

=== November ===
- November 11:
  - In the nationwide general elections held, incumbents Pres. Marcos and Vice Pres. Lopez are reelected in their respective positions, with the former as the first (and the last in electoral history) to win for a second full term as president in the presidential elections and the latter elected to a third full term as Vice President of the Philippines. The administration party, the Nacionalista Party, won 6 out of 8 seats in the Philippine Senate and 88 out of 110 seats in the House of Representatives.
  - Puerto Princessa becomes a city in the province of Palawan through ratification of Republic Act 5906.
  - Electorates of the municipality of Tarlac in the province of Tarlac rejected the cityhood law under Republic Act 5907.

== Holidays ==
As per Act No. 2711 section 29, issued on March 10, 1917, any legal holiday of fixed date falls on Sunday, the next succeeding day shall be observed as legal holiday. Sundays are also considered legal religious holidays. Bonifacio Day was added through Philippine Legislature Act No. 2946. It was signed by then-Governor General Francis Burton Harrison in 1921. As per Republic Act No. 3022, April 9th is proclaimed as Bataan Day. Independence Day was changed from July 4 (Philippine Republic Day) to June 12 (Philippine Independence Day) on August 4, 1964.

- January 1 – New Year's Day
- February 22 – Legal Holiday
- April 3 – Maundy Thursday
- April 4 – Good Friday
- April 9 – Araw ng Kagitingan (Day of Valor)
- May 1 – Labor Day
- June 12 – Independence Day
- July 4 – Philippine Republic Day
- August 13 – Legal Holiday
- November 27 – Thanksgiving Day
- November 30 – Bonifacio Day
- December 25 – Christmas Day
- December 30 – Rizal Day

== Entertainment and culture ==
- July 19 – Miss Philippines Gloria Diaz is crowned as the first filipina to win Miss Universe 1969 which was held in Long Beach, California, United States.
- September 10 – The Cultural Center of the Philippines is inaugurated, located along Manila Bay.
- October 15 – DZKB-TV Channel 9 is launched by Kanalon Broadcasting System (now Radio Philippines Network), a Philippine TV station, owned by Roberto S. Benedicto.

== Births ==
- January 2 – Dean Francis Alfar, author
- January 3 – Bayani Agbayani, actor, singer, and comedian
- January 14 – Vergel Meneses, basketball player and politician
- March 4 – Dawn Zulueta, Filipino actress
- March 10 – Rolando Andaya Jr., Filipino lawyer and politician (d. 2022)
- March 20 – Ruffy Biazon, Filipino politician
- March 31 – Maritoni Fernandez, actress
- April 13 – Migz Zubiri, Filipino businessman and politician
- April 26 – Mikey Arroyo, Filipino politician and actor
- May 12 – Eileen Ermita-Buhain, Filipino politician
- May 31 – Ace Barbers, Filipino politician
- May 15 – Lovely Rivero, Filipina actress
- June 19 – Nancy Catamco, Filipina politician
- June 27 - Claire Castro, Filipino lawyer and podcaster
- June 30 – Mike Defensor, Filipino politician
- July 3 – Kaka Bag-ao, Filipina human rights lawyer and politician
- July 13 – Vicky Morales, Filipina television journalist and news anchor
- July 25 – Blakdyak, singer, actor and comedian (d. 2016)
- July 28 – Alice Dixson, Filipino actress
- August 3 – Lani Misalucha, Filipina singer
- August 5 – Romulo Peña Jr., Filipino politician
- August 12 – Aga Muhlach, Filipino actor
- August 22 – Jean Garcia, Filipino actress
- September 1 – Galo Ador Jr., Filipino comic writer (d. 2008)
- September 5 – Amy Perez, Filipino actress and TV host
- September 16 – Janno Gibbs, Filipino actor, comedian, and singer
- October 8:
  - Arthur Defensor Jr., Filipino politician
  - Freddie Abuda, Filipino basketball player
- October 10 – Francis Escudero, Filipino politician
- November 8 – Gardo Versoza, actor
- November 22 – Chin Chin Gutierrez, actress and environmentalist
- November 23 – Robin Padilla, Filipino actor, producer
- December 17 – Michael V., Filipino comedian and actor
- December 26 – JV Ejercito, Filipino politician

== Deaths ==
- March 31 – Botong Francisco, Filipino muralist (b. 1914)
- June 5 – Simeon Toribio, Filipino athlete (b. 1905)
- August 26 – Alejandro G. Abadilla, Filipino poet and essayist (b. 1906)
