= 1971 in the Philippines =

- Decades: 1950s; 1960s; 1970s; 1980s; 1990s
- See also: List of years in the Philippines; films

1971 in the Philippines details events of note that happened in the Philippines in the year 1971.

== Incumbents ==
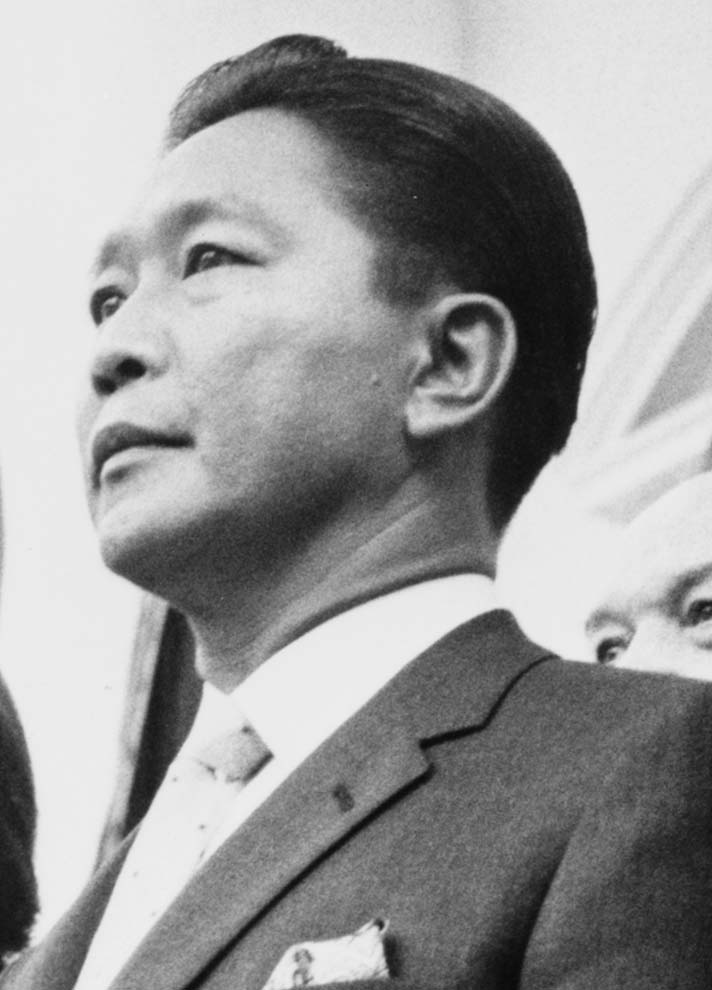
President Ferdinand Marcos at the White House in 1966.

- President: Ferdinand Marcos (Nacionalista)
- Vice President: Fernando Lopez (Nacionalista)
- House Speaker:
  - José Laurel, Jr. (until April 1)
  - Cornelio Villareal (starting April 1)
- Chief Justice: Roberto Concepcion
- Congress: 7th

== Events ==
=== February ===
- February 1–9 – Diliman Commune occurs wherein students, led by Kabataang Makabayan and Samahang Demokratiko ng Kabataan, set up barricades at University of the Philippines Diliman. It becomes a protest against the militarization in the university as clashes result to arrests and the death of at least a student. Some facilities, including radio station DZUP and the UP Press, are seized. After series of dialogues, barricades in the entire UP system are voluntarily removed, including those at the UP Los Baños which have been set up since February 7.

=== April ===
- April 15 – A Philippine Air Force plane crashes into a rice field near an air base in Pampanga, killing all 40 people on board.

=== May ===
- May 1 – The 55th Philippine Constabulary Company (PC), then assigned to the PC's Metropolitan Command (Metrocom), fires into a crowd of students protesting in front of the Philippines' Legislative Building, killing three protesters in what became known as the May Day Massacre.

=== June ===
- June 1 – The 320-member Constitutional Convention, formed to draft a new Constitution which will replace that of 1935, formally convenes at the Manila Hotel.
- June 11 – Former president Carlos P. Garcia, a delegate from Bohol, is elected president of the Constitutional Convention, serving only until his death on June 14.
- June 19 – Suspected members of extremist Christian group Ilagas storm in a mosque in Carmen, Cotabato, and gun the Moslems down, killing at least 65.
- June 29 – Former president Diosdado Macapagal of Pampanga is elected to replace Garcia as president of the convention. Sotero Laurel of Batangas has served in the same position in acting capacity.

=== July ===
- July 8 – Presidential Arm on National Minorities (Panamin), represented by its director Manuel Elizalde Jr. and its research director Robert B. Fox, announcing the discovery of the Tasaday tribe—described as apparently existed in Stone Age isolation, reports contacting 24 of "no more than 100" of them in a forest in South Cotabato on June 7–8 and 16.
- July 17 or 18 – A group consisting of anthropologists and journalists, and being led by Elizalde, makes an interview with 25 of about 100 members of the "Tasadays" in the southern Mindanao.

=== August ===
- August 21 – Explosion of fragmentation grenades hurled by terrorists in a political campaign rally of the Liberal Party at Plaza Miranda in Quiapo, Manila, kill nine and injure 95 others, including many prominent LP politicians.
- August 22 – President Marcos suspends the Writ of Habeas Corpus

=== September ===
- September 5 – On the day of scheduled peace conference called by President Marcos to seek an end the ongoing sectarian violence in Lanao del Norte, an opposition politician is killed in his residence; while 20 armed men allegedly from the Moslems' Barracudas are killed in a gun battle with government troops.
- September 19 – Philippine Statehood, U.S.A., a movement being headed by former congressman Rufino Antonio, surfaces publicly through a newspaper advertisement on its nationwide campaign for the Philippines to be the 51st state of the United States by 1973. Since then, its membership reportedly doubled to 2.5 million within a month.

=== October ===
- October 10 – Murder convict and fugitive Leonardo Manecio (Nardong Putik) is killed in a highway shootout with a team from the National Bureau of Investigation in Kawit, Cavite, concluding a massive manhunt against him.

=== November ===
- November 8:
  - Senatorial elections were held in the Philippines. The opposition Liberal Party took 5 seats in the Philippine Senate while 3 seats were taken by the Nacionalista Party, the administration party.
  - Oroquieta becomes a city in the province of Misamis Occidental through ratification of Republic Act 6022.
  - Army members, searching for Moslem voters in Lanao del Sur, open fire on civilians, killing 39 and injuring 36. Fourteen military personnel would later be charged of murder in April 1972.

=== Unknown dates ===
- Moro National Liberation Front (MNLF) is formally established by Nur Misuari in an island in Malaysia.

== Holidays ==
As per Act No. 2711 section 29, issued on March 10, 1917, any legal holiday of fixed date falls on Sunday, the next succeeding day shall be observed as legal holiday. Sundays are also considered legal religious holidays. Bonifacio Day was added through Philippine Legislature Act No. 2946. It was signed by then-Governor General Francis Burton Harrison in 1921. On October 28, 1931, the Act No. 3827 was approved declaring the last Sunday of August as National Heroes Day. As per Republic Act No. 3022, April 9 was proclaimed as Bataan Day. Independence Day was changed from July 4 (Philippine Republic Day) to June 12 (Philippine Independence Day) on August 4, 1964.

- January 1 – New Year's Day
- February 22 – Legal Holiday
- April 9:
  - Maundy Thursday
  - Araw ng Kagitingan (Day of Valor)
- April 10 – Good Friday
- May 1 – Labor Day
- June 12 – Independence Day
- July 4 – Philippine Republic Day
- August 13 – Legal Holiday
- August 29 – National Heroes Day
- November 25 – Thanksgiving Day
- November 30 – Bonifacio Day
- December 25 – Christmas Day
- December 30 – Rizal Day

== Sports ==
- October 1 – Alberto Jangalay dies after being knocked down by Kid Snowball of South Africa in the 8th of the 10-round fight—the 43rd in his entire boxing career—in Brisbane, Australia.

== Births ==
- February 1 – Cathy Yap-Yang, business journalist
- February 14 – Kris Aquino, actress and TV host
- February 22 – Lea Salonga, actress and singer
- February 24 – Paolo Abrera, actor, TV host and commercial model
- March 13 – Janet Abuel, lawyer, accountant, and public servant
- May 14 – Bernadette Romulo-Puyat, government official
- May 16 – Gary Estrada, actor
- May 19 – Sylvia Sanchez, actress
- May 22 – Raimund Marasigan, rock musician
- July 21 – Paco Arespacochaga, musician and songwriter
- July 23 – Eugene Domingo, actress
- August 2 – Tina Paner, singer and actress
- August 7 – Lawrence Fortun, politician
- August 12 – Ate Gay, singer and comedian
- August 26 – Antonio Trillanes, politician
- September 2 – Arnold Arre, graphic novelist
- September 7 – Melissa de la Cruz author
- September 16 – Antolin Oreta, politician
- October 14 – Robert Jaworski Jr., basketball player
- October 19 – Noli Locsin, basketball player
- October 27 – Niño Muhlach, actor
- November 12 – Joet Garcia, politician
- November 13 – Buddy Zabala, musician and producer
- December 13 – Van Partible, animator, writer and producer
- November 30 – Bobby Andrews, actor
- December 15 – Diego Llorico, comedian

=== Date unknown ===
- Cherry Pie Picache, actress

== Deaths ==
- January 4 – Conrado Benitez, founder of the Philippine Rural Reconstruction Movement
- February 16 - Edgar Ang Sinco, student activist
- March 4 – Marcial Lichauco, lawyer and diplomat
- March 16 – Vivencio Cuyugan, politician, boxer and one of the founders of the Hukbalahap
- April 29 – Adelina Gurrea, journalist, poet and playwright
- June 14 – Carlos P. Garcia, 8th President of the Philippines
- September 5 – Vicente Garces, politician, writer and poet
- October 10 – Nardong Putik, gangster
- October 28 – Jesús A. Villamor, Filipino-American pilot
