= 1979 Sangguniang Pampook elections =

Local elections in the Philippines

- May 7, 1979

The 1979 Sangguniang Pampook elections were held on May 7, 1979, to elect the two Sangguniang Pampook (Regional Legislative Assemblies) of Western Mindanao (Region IX) and Central Mindanao (Region XII), the two autonomous regions established under Presidential Decree No. 1618. Their territories now largely correspond to Zamboanga Peninsula and Soccsksargen, respectively.

== Regional Legislative Assemblies (Sangguniang Pampook) ==
Each autonomous region had a Sangguniang Pampook consisting of 18 representatives.

They comprised:

- 17 representatives elected from the provinces and cities of each region.
- One sectoral representative selected from among the youth, agricultural workers, or non-agricultural workers (industrial labor) of the region. Sectoral representatives were required to meet the same qualifications as members of the Interim Batasang Pambansa.

=== Elections ===
The 17 Regional Legislative Assembly representatives for each region were elected at-large by the registered voters of their respective provinces and cities. The candidate receiving the highest number of votes in each constituency was declared elected.

== See also ==
- History of Mindanao
- Politics of Soccsksargen
- Politics of Zamboanga Peninsula
