= 1979 Republic of the Congo constitutional referendum =

- 8 July 1979

Results
Choice	Votes	%
Yes	707,421	96.95%
No	22,284	3.05%
Valid votes	729,705	97.82%
Invalid or blank votes	16,277	2.18%
Total votes	745,982	100.00%
Registered voters/turnout	826,193	90.29%
- Sources: Nohlen et al., African Elections Database

A constitutional referendum was held in the People's Republic of the Congo on 8 July 1979. The new constitution was approved by 96.93% of voters, with a 90.3% turnout.

== Results ==
Choice	Votes	%
For	707,421	96.9
Against	22,284	3.1
Invalid/blank votes	16,277	-
Total	746,082	100
Source: Nohlen et al.
