= Benjamín Mendoza =

Bolivian surrealist painter who made an unsuccessful attempt to assassinate Pope Paul VI

Benjamín Mendoza y Amor Flores (March 31, 1933 – August 2, 2014) was a Bolivian surrealist painter who made an unsuccessful attempt to assassinate Pope Paul VI in Manila in 1970.

== Personal life ==
Mendoza left La Paz, Bolivia, in 1962. From 1962 until 1970, he lived in Argentina, the United States, Japan, Hong Kong and the Philippines. In Argentina, in the early 1960s, he exhibited his work in a few galleries in the San Telmo district of Buenos Aires, and in 1963 illustrated the book Todo estaba sucio by Raúl Barón Biza. He also made two murals for the Manila Hotel in Mar del Plata, which no longer exist. He then exhibited in the Soviet Union, Hawaii, and after that moved to the Philippines.

== Assassination attempt ==
On November 27, 1970, at approximately 9:30 in the morning, Mendoza, dressed as a priest and with crucifix in hand, managed to approach Pope Paul VI who had just disembarked from his chartered DC-8 jet at Manila International Airport. Mendoza stabbed the pontiff twice in the neck with a kris (a short, wavy dagger), hitting him on either side of the jugular vein. On both sides of the weapon was the inscription "bullets, superstitions, flags, kingdoms, garbage, armies and shit."

The private secretary of Pope Paul VI, Archbishop Pasquale Macchi, reduced the damage by blocking the aggressor's arm. In addition, the Pope was wearing a rigid collar to relieve pain from cervical spondylosis, another factor that lightened his wounds. Suffering only slight injuries to his chest, the Pope continued his official visit according to the planned program. The fact that he was wounded at all was not revealed until after his death in 1978.

Mendoza was then subdued by monsignors Macchi and Paul Marcinkus and was subsequently arrested. Mendoza, who said during his trial "I will save mankind from superstition", was convicted of attempted murder.

== Life after prison ==
While Mendoza was in prison, a gallery owner ordered a series of his paintings for an exhibition. The paintings were sold in their entirety.

After serving a 38-month prison sentence in the Philippines, Mendoza was released on bail of £533 (approximately US$700) and deported to Bolivia in 1974. Upon regaining his freedom, he organized several exhibitions in more than 80 countries, living in Lima. When asked about his attempt to assassinate Pope Paul VI, he said he simply wanted to attract attention. According to filmmaker Armando Bó, who made contact with Mendoza, he acted in a "moment of madness".

== See also ==
- Juan María Fernández y Krohn, attempted assassin of John Paul II

== Bibliography ==
- Sergio Campailla, Wanted. Benjamín Mendoza y Amor. Il pittore che attentò alla vita di papa Paolo VI, Marsilio, Venezia 2016.
