= 1957 in the Philippines =

- Decades: 1930s; 1940s; 1950s; 1960s; 1970s
- See also: List of years in the Philippines; films

1957 in the Philippines details events of note that happened in the Philippines in the year 1957.

== Incumbents ==
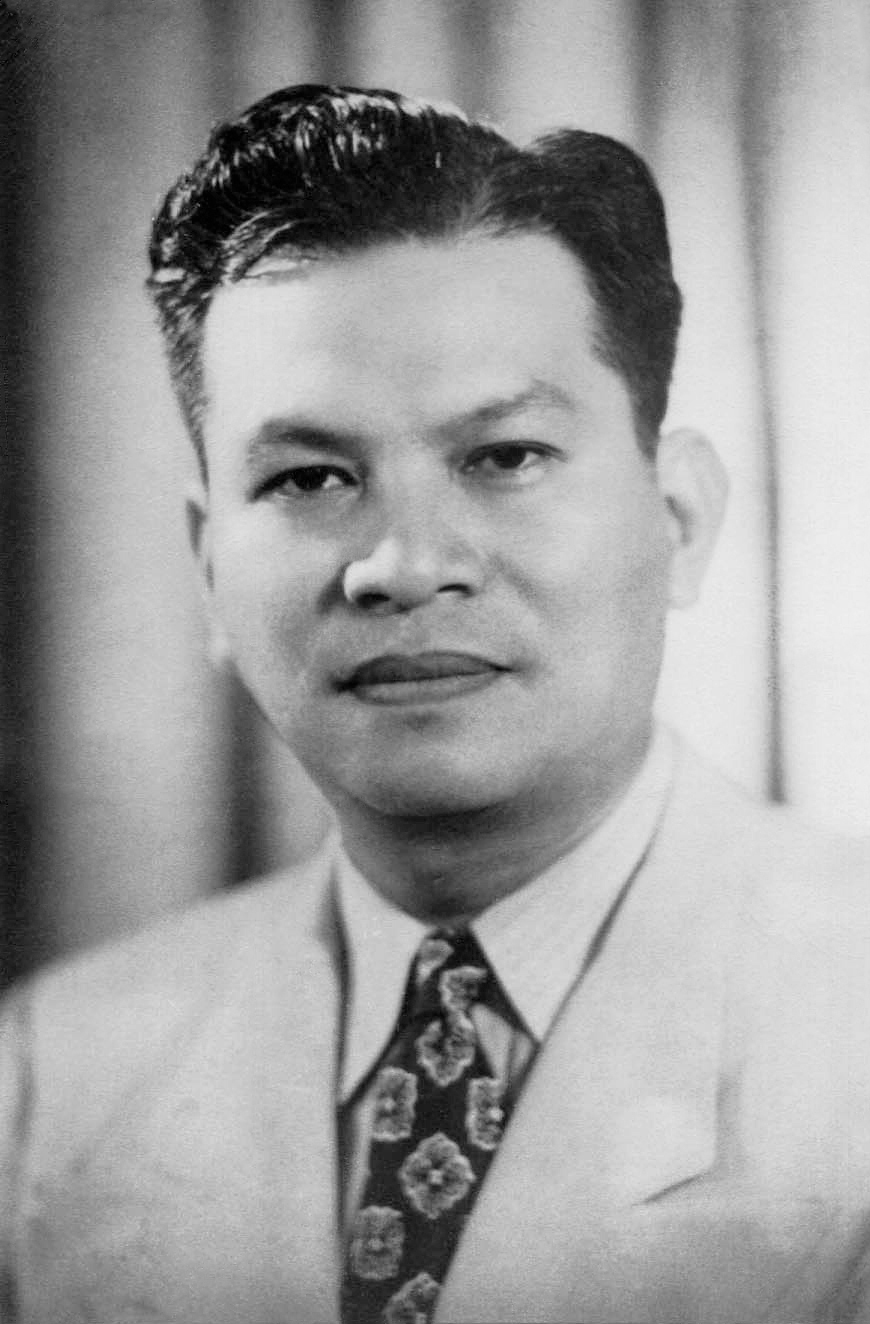
Outgoing President Ramon Magsaysay

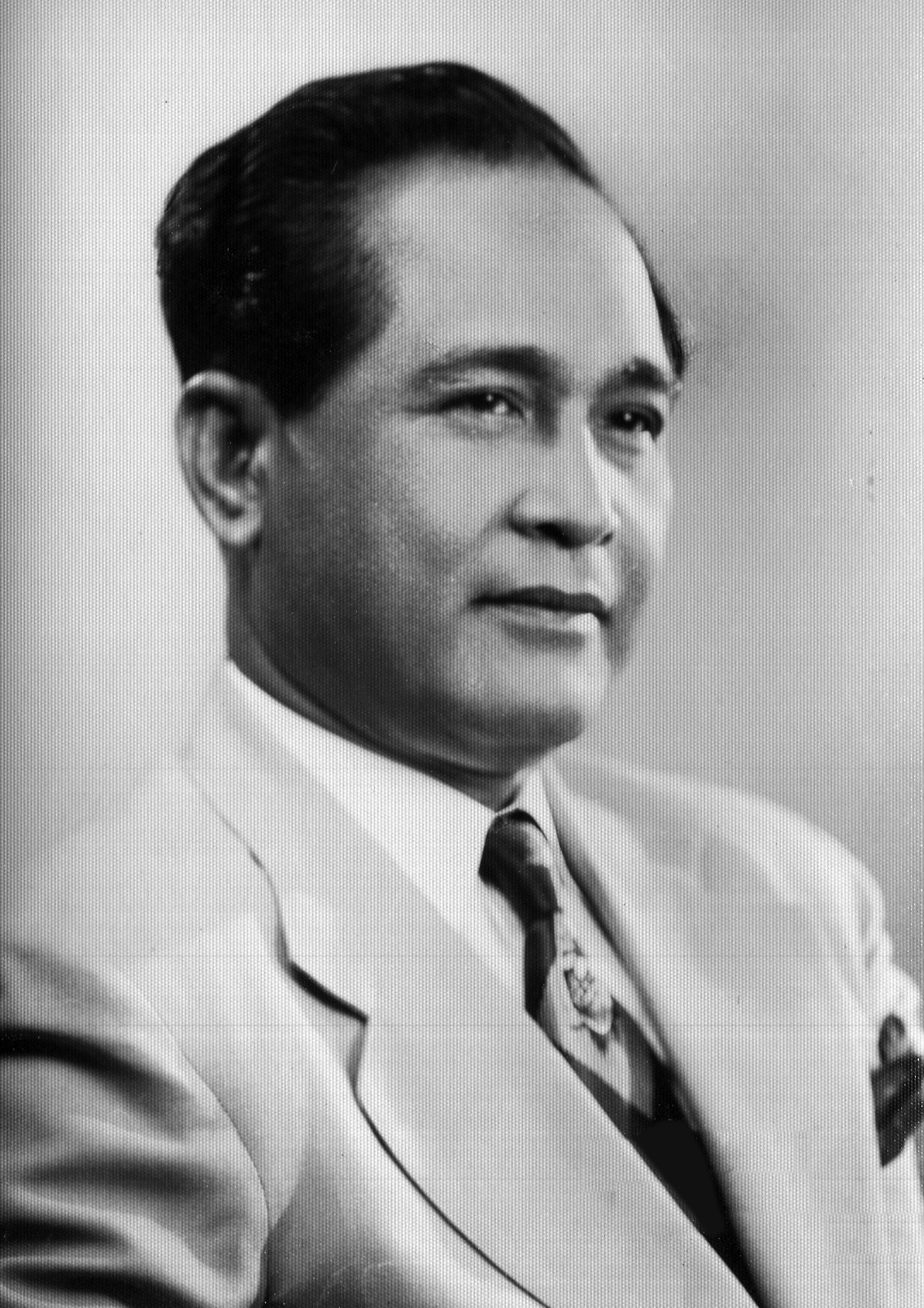
Incoming President Carlos P. Garcia

- President:
  - Ramon Magsaysay (Nacionalista Party) (until March 17)
  - Carlos P. Garcia (Nacionalista Party) (starting March 17)
- Vice President:
  - Carlos P. Garcia (Nacionalista Party) (until March 18)
  - Diosdado Macapagal (Liberal) (starting December 30)
- Chief Justice: Ricardo Paras
- Congress: 3rd (until December 10)

== Events ==
=== March ===
- March 17 – President Magsaysay dies in a plane crash. Vice President Carlos P. Garcia assumes the presidency.

=== June ===
- June 12 – Silay becomes a city in the province of Negros Occidental through Republic Act 1621.
- June 20 - The Anti-Subversion Act is signed into law outlawing the Communist Party of the Philippines, its military arm commonly known as the Hukbalahap, as well as potential succeeding organizations.

=== July ===
- July 10 – The Philippine Army establishes its headquarters located at the Fort Andres Bonifacio in Taguig, Rizal, under the leadership of Brigadier General Leoncio S. Tan.

=== November ===
- November 14 – Carlos P. Garcia is elected president in the presidential elections.

== Holidays ==
As per Act No. 2711 section 29, issued on March 10, 1917, any legal holiday of fixed date falls on Sunday, the next succeeding day shall be observed as legal holiday. Sundays are also considered legal religious holidays. Bonifacio Day was added through Philippine Legislature Act No. 2946. It was signed by then-Governor General Francis Burton Harrison in 1921. On October 28, 1931, the Act No. 3827 was approved declaring the last Sunday of August as National Heroes Day.

- January 1 – New Year's Day
- February 22 – Legal Holiday
- April 18 – Maundy Thursday
- April 19 – Good Friday
- May 1 – Labor Day
- July 4 – Philippine Republic Day
- August 13 – Legal Holiday
- August 25 – National Heroes Day
- November 28 – Thanksgiving Day
- November 30 – Bonifacio Day
- December 25 – Christmas Day
- December 30 – Rizal Day

== Births ==
- January 4 – Rafael Nantes, governor of the Province of Quezon, Philippines from 2007 to 2010. (d. 2010)
- January 17 – Hilda Koronel, actress
- January 20 – Jessie Dellosa, Chief of staff of the Philippine Armed Forces
- January 22 – Rene Requiestas, Filipino actor and comedian. (d. 1993)
- January 30 – Paeng Nepomuceno, six-time World Bowling Champion Filipino bowler
- February 13 – Francisco Duque III, former two-term Philippine Secretary of Health
- February 14 – Rolando Navarrete, Filipino ex-boxer
- February 23 – Mel Sta. Maria, Filipino lawyer, broadcaster, professor in Ateneo Law School and dean of Far Eastern University Institute of Law since November 2013
- March 23 – Victoria Sy-Alvarado, Filipino politician.
- April 22 – Jaime Aristotle Alip, Filipino entrepreneur, politician and the Founder and managing director of the CARD Mutually Reinforcing Institutions
- May 6 – Benedicto Ducat, Filipino impressionist painter
- May 13 – Mar Roxas, former Senator of the Philippines
- June 21 –Luis Antonio Tagle, Roman Catholic Filipino Cardinal
- July 20 – Judith Cajes, Filipino politician
- August 4 – Mark Joseph, actor (d. 2020)
- August 19 – Maria Isabel Lopez, actress
- September 7:
- Weng Weng, Filipino actor and martial artist (d. 1992)
- September 8 – Liza Maza, member of the Philippine House of Representatives
- September 13 – Bongbong Marcos, 17th President of the Philippines
- September 23 – Bernardo Piñol, Jr., Filipino politician and journalist.
- October 7 – Joey Marquez, Filipino actor, comedian, and politician.
- November 4 – Carlos Siguion-Reyna, director
- November 12 – Abdulmunir Mundoc Arbison, Filipino politician
- November 13 – Lolita Carbon, singer-songwriter and member of Asin (band)
- November 14 – Ronnie Lazaro, actor
- December 8 – Rodolfo Luat, Filipino professional pool player
- December 14 – Tim Cone, American PBA head coach
- December 24 – Frederick Adams, basketball player
- December 26 – Rey Fortaleza, Olympic boxer

=== Date unknown ===
- Julie Ann Fortich, Filipino actress
- Prisco Nilo, Filipino meteorologist.

== Deaths ==
- March 17:
  - Ramon Magsaysay, President of the Philippines (b. 1907)
  - Tomas Cabili, journalist, educator and assemblyman from Lanao (b. 1903)
- June 14 - Maria Beatriz del Rosario Arroyo, Filipino nun and the founder of the Dominican Sisters of the Most Holy Rosary of the Philippines (b. 1884)
- August 4 - Eugenio Pérez, Filipino politician (b. 1896)
