= 2027 in the Philippines =

- Decades: 2000s; 2010s; 2020s
- See also: List of years in the Philippines; films; music; sports

2027 in the Philippines details notable events that will occur, or are scheduled to take place, in the Philippines in 2027.

== Events ==
=== Predicted and scheduled ===
- January 15 – The long-overdue transition of the country's television broadcast from analog to digital will begin, with the initial analog switch-off in entire Mega Manila, (Note: Mega Manila, according to the National Telecommunications Commission, covers Metro Manila region and the provinces of Bataan, Bulacan, Cavite, Laguna, Pampanga and Rizal.) whose process began in November 2025. It will be followed by regional expansion in 2028 which is expected to be done within two years.

==== Date unknown ====
- The Senate will start its long-delayed transfer to its new building in Taguig, possibly in the year's middle part.
- Baguio is set to attain its smart city status.
- The MRT-7 in Metro Manila will be launched.
- The Unified Grand Central Station connecting LRT-1, MRT-3, and MRT-7 will be completed.
- Philippines–European Union relations: A free trade agreement between the Philippines and the European Union will be finalized.
- Canada–Philippines relations: A free trade agreement between the Philippines and Canada will be signed.
- Vehicles part of the Public Utility Vehicle Modernization Program will comprise 40% of total Public Utility Vehicles in Metro Manila.
- The 500-kilometer (310 mi) Mindanao Transport Connectivity Improvement Project is set to begin.
- The pilot run of the delayed Davao Public Transport Modernization Project in Davao City is scheduled after previous targets were not met.
- The rehabilitation of EDSA will begin and will be finished within six months.
- The revised K-to-12 program of the Department of Education will be fully implemented.
- Philippine Airlines will formally join Oneworld, becoming the first Filipino airline to join a major airline alliance.

== Holidays ==
On September 8, 2026, the national government issues Proclamation No. 1427 providing the list of regular and special non-working holidays for 2027.

Regular

- January 1 – New Year's Day
- March 25 – Maundy Thursday
- March 26 – Good Friday
- April 9 – Araw ng Kagitingan (Day of Valor)
- May 1 – Labor Day
- June 12 – Independence Day
- August 30 – National Heroes Day
- November 30 – Bonifacio Day
- December 25 – Christmas Day
- December 30 – Rizal Day
- TBA – Eidul Fitr
- TBA – Eidul Adha

Special (Non-working) days

- February 6 – Chinese New Year
- March 27 – Black Saturday
- August 21 – Ninoy Aquino Day
- November 1 – All Saints Day
- November 2 – All Souls Day
- December 8 – Feast of the Immaculate Conception
- December 24 – Christmas Eve
- December 31 – Last Day of the Year

Special (Working) day

- February 25 – EDSA People Power Revolution Anniversary

== See also ==
=== Country overviews ===
- History of the Philippines
- History of the Philippines (1986–present)
- Outline of the Philippines
- Government of the Philippines
- Politics of the Philippines
- List of years in the Philippines
- Timeline of Philippine history

=== Related timelines for current period ===
- 2027
- 2027 in politics and government
- 2020s
