= 1958 in the Philippines =

- Decades: 1930s; 1940s; 1950s; 1960s; 1970s
- See also: List of years in the Philippines; films

1958 in the Philippines details events of note that happened in the Philippines in the year 1958.

== Incumbents ==
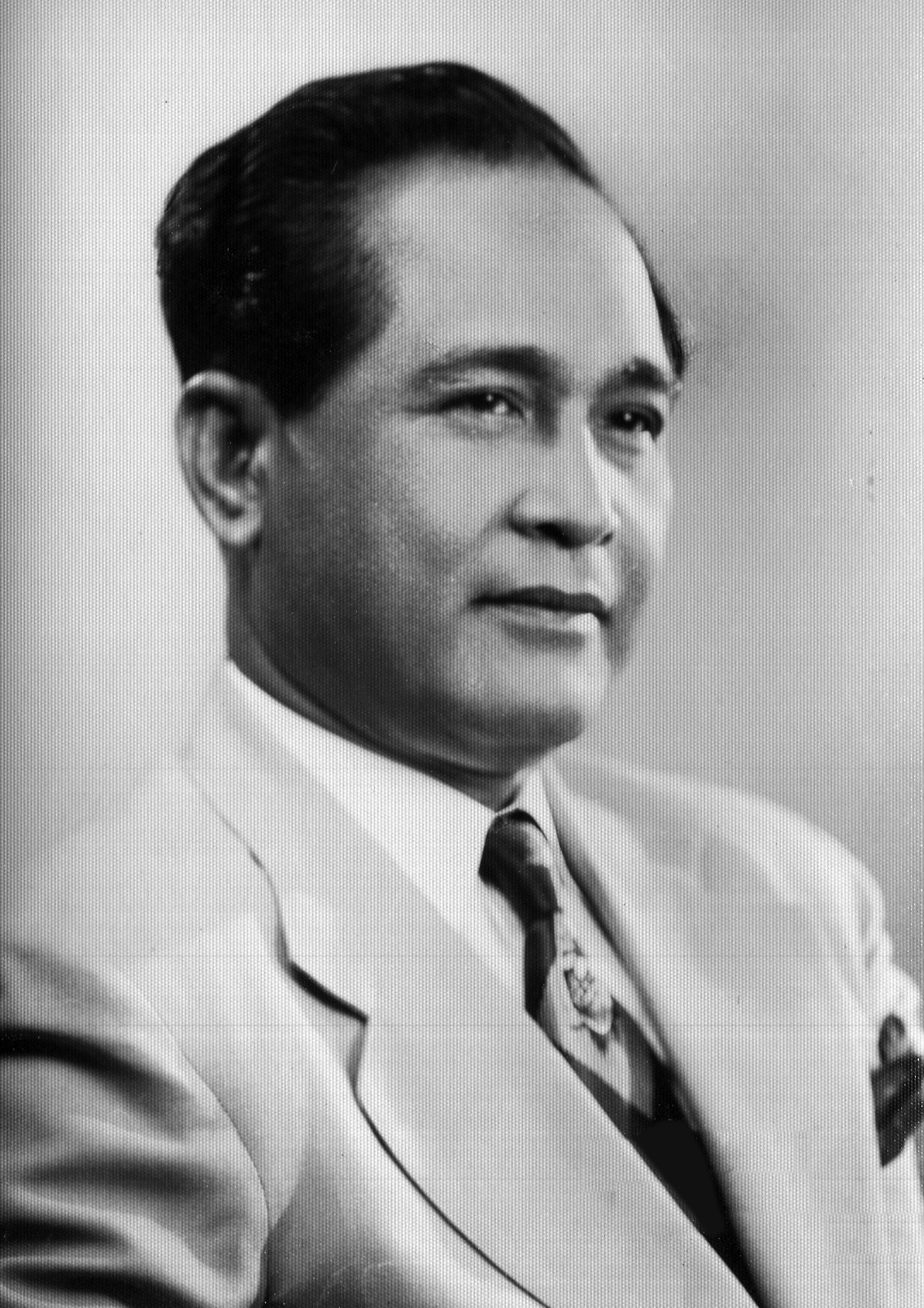
President Carlos P. Garcia

- President: Carlos P. Garcia (Nacionalista Party)
- Vice President: Diosdado Macapagal (Liberal)
- Chief Justice: Ricardo Paras
- Congress: 4th (starting January 27)

== Events ==
=== August ===
- August 28 – The Filipino first policy is promulgated.

== Holidays ==
As per Act No. 2711 section 29, issued on March 10, 1917, any legal holiday of fixed date falls on Sunday, the next succeeding day shall be observed as legal holiday. Sundays are also considered legal religious holidays. Bonifacio Day was added through Philippine Legislature Act No. 2946. It was signed by then-Governor General Francis Burton Harrison in 1921. On October 28, 1931, the Act No. 3827 was approved declaring the last Sunday of August as National Heroes Day.

- January 1 – New Year's Day
- February 22 – Legal Holiday
- April 18 – Maundy Thursday
- April 19 – Good Friday
- May 1 – Labor Day
- July 4 – Philippine Republic Day
- August 13 – Legal Holiday
- August 31 – National Heroes Day
- November 28 – Thanksgiving Day
- November 30 – Bonifacio Day
- December 25 – Christmas Day
- December 30 – Rizal Day

== Births ==
- January 10 – Pantaleon Alvarez, Speaker of the House of Representatives
- February 4 – Sammy Acaylar, volleyball coach (d. 2025)
- February 6 – Joel Banal, basketball player and coach
- February 24 – Milagrosa Tan, politician (d. 2019)
- March 3 – Neil Ocampo, anchorman (d. 2020)
- March 9 – Raul Lambino, lawyer
- March 14 – Leo Austria, basketball player and coach
- April 4 – Ces Quesada, actress and TV host
- May 21 – Isko Salvador, actor and comedian
- April 26 – Jamby Madrigal, politician and businesswoman
- May 27 – Jesse Robredo, former Mayor of Naga and Interior and Local Government secretary (d. 2012)
- June 10 – Jose I. Tejada, politician
- June 13 – Sonny Parsons, actor, singer, and member of the Filipino band, Hagibis (d. 2020)
- July 16:
  - Sally Ponce Enrile, politician
  - Jack Enrile, politician
- July 18 – Malou de Guzman, actress
- July 31 – Mario Dumaual, journalist (d. 2023)
- August 19:
  - Manuel Mamba, politician
  - Chito Loyzaga, basketball player
- October 5 – Dagul, dwarf actor and comedian
- December 13 – Allan K., comedian and host
- December 21 – Cerge Remonde, journalist and politician (d. 2010)
- December 28 – Claire dela Fuente, singer (d. 2021)

== Deaths ==
- February 27 – Ruperto Kangleon, military figure and politician (b. 1890)
