= 1963 in the Philippines =

- Decades: 1940s; 1950s; 1960s; 1970s; 1980s
- See also: List of years in the Philippines; films

1963 in the Philippines details events of note that happened in the Philippines in the year 1963.

== Incumbents ==
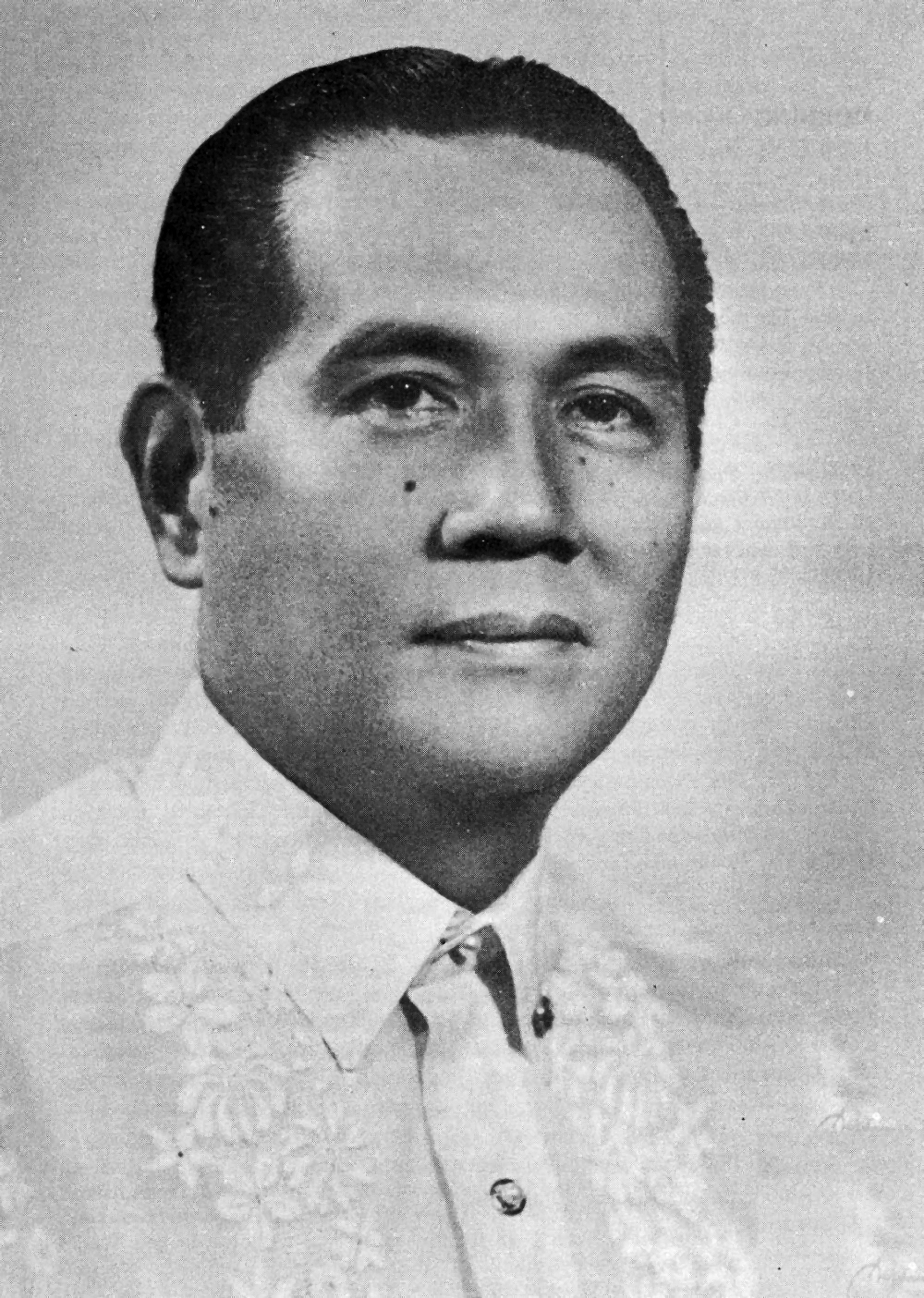
President Diosdado Macapagal

- President: Diosdado Macapagal (Liberal)
- Vice President: Emmanuel Pelaez (Liberal)
- Chief Justice: César Bengzon
- Congress: 5th

== Events ==
=== March ===
- March 2–3 – A Philippine Airlines plane with Cotabato City–Davao City route crashes into a mountain near Malalag, Davao. Its wreckage is found the following day. All 27 persons aboard are killed.

=== April ===
- April 5 – Ferdinand Marcos became President of the Senate of the Philippines.

=== July ===
- July 20 – Lalaine Bennett won 3rd Runner up of Miss Universe 1963 at Miami Beach, Florida, US. She is the first Filipina to Runner-up at Miss Universe.
- July 28 – Twenty-four boy scouts and leaders, who are supposed to participate in the 11th World Scout Jamboree in Marathon, Greece, are among the 63 persons killed in a plane crash into the Arabian Sea off Bombay, India, while en route to Athens. Meanwhile, three scouts would join the jamboree with their arrival on August 4.
- July 31 – August 2 – A Summit Conference on the proposed Confederation of Malaysia, involving leaders of the Philippines, Malaya and Indonesia, is held.

=== August ===
- August 8 – President Macapagal signs the Agricultural Land Reform Code, abolishing tenancy.

=== November ===
- November 12 – Angeles becomes a city in the province of Pampanga through ratification of Republic Act 3700.

== Holidays ==
As per Act No. 2711 section 29, issued on March 10, 1917, if any legal holiday of fixed date falls on Sunday, the next succeeding day shall be observed as legal holiday. Sundays are also considered legal religious holidays. Bonifacio Day was added through Philippine Legislature Act No. 2946. It was signed by then-Governor General Francis Burton Harrison in 1921. On October 28, 1931, the Act No. 3827 was approved declaring the last Sunday of August as National Heroes Day. As per Republic Act No. 3022, April 9th is proclaimed as Bataan Day.

- January 1 – New Year's Day
- February 22 – Legal Holiday
- April 9 – Bataan Day
- April 11 – Maundy Thursday
- April 12 – Good Friday
- May 1 – Labor Day
- July 4 – Independence Day
- August 13 – Legal Holiday
- August 25 – National Heroes Day
- November 28 – Thanksgiving Day
- November 30 – Bonifacio Day
- December 25 – Christmas Day
- December 30 – Rizal Day

== Births ==
- February 5 – Franz Pumaren, basketball player, coach, and politician
- February 17 – Jinggoy Estrada, actor and politician
- April 1 – Teddy Diaz, founding member, guitar player of The Dawn (d. 1988)
- April 2 – Teddy Alfarero, basketball player (d. 2004)
- April 25 – Boyet Sison, journalist and sports commentator (d. 2022)
- May 12 – Cherie Gil, actress (d. 2022)
- June 14 – Mark Anthony Santos, politician
- June 15 – Allan Caidic, basketball player
- August 1 – Ato Agustin, basketball player and coach
- August 9 – Carmi Martin, actress
- August 11 – Bobby Nalzaro, radio and television journalist (d. 2022)
- August 14 – Edwin Olivarez, athlete, politician, and businessman
- August 24 – Kiko Pangilinan, lawyer, politician, and farm owner
- August 28 – Gerry Ortega, RMN radio commentator and human activist (d. 2011)
- October 2 – Maria Ressa, journalist
- October 3 – Marion Peck, painter
- October 5 – E.R. Ejercito, actor and politician
- October 15 – Maria Teresa Carlson, actress (d. 2002)
- October 16 – Gilberto Duavit Jr., businessman
- October 21 – Jaclyn Jose, actress (d. 2024)
- October 25 – Grace Padaca, politician and broadcaster
- November 6 – Arthur B. Robes, politician
- November 14 – Martin Romualdez, businessman, lawyer, and politician (Speaker of the House of Representatives)
- December 18 – Yves Dignadice, basketball player
- December 25 – Noel Cabangon, singer, actor, and composer

=== Dates unknown ===
- Benjamin Abadiano, lexicographer
- September – Tessa Prieto-Valdes, columnist, media personality, and socialite

== Deaths ==
- March 7 – Jaime C. de Veyra, Filipino academic (b. 1873)
- April 11 – Teofisto Guingona, Sr., father of former Vice President Teofisto Guingona, Jr.(b. 1883)
- April 12 – Felix Manalo, 76, founder and first Executive Minister of Iglesia ni Cristo. (b. 1886)
- May 1 – Lope K. Santos, Filipino novelist. (b. 1879)
- September 13 – Frances E. Parrette (b. August 17, 1907)
- December 15 – Sotero Cabahug, lawyer, legislator, and politician (b. 1891)

=== Deaths Unknown ===
- Regino Ylanan, Filipino sports administrator, writer and athlete.(born 1889)
