= 2028 in the Philippines =

- Decades: 2000s; 2010s; 2020s
- See also: List of years in the Philippines; films

2028 in the Philippines details notable events that will occur, or are scheduled to take place, in the Philippines in 2028.

== Events ==
=== Predicted and scheduled ===
- March – The country will host the Asian Beach Games.
- May 8 – National and local elections will be held. The new president, vice president, and 12 senators will be elected.
- November 13 – The barangay and Sangguniang Kabataan elections will be held nationwide by the virtue of Republic Act No. 12326, signed into law by President Marcos in 2026. (Note: On September 24, 2026, President Marcos signed into law Republic Act No. 12326 which moved the scheduled date of the barangay and Sangguniang Kabataan elections from November 2, 2026, to the second Monday of November 2028.)

==== Date unknown ====
- Partial operation of the North–South Commuter Railway, particularly at the Valenzuela–Malolos segment, will begin by early 2028. The entire project is expected to be fully operational by 2033.
- Initial run of Metro Manila Subway will be conducted.
- Next generation of Philippine passport with security features will be issued by the Department of Foreign Affairs (DFA).
- The government will reach over one million housing units for the Pambansang Pabahay Para sa Pilipino.
- The Southeast Asian Plus Youth Games will be inaugurated in the country.
- The regional expansion of the transition of the country's television broadcast from analog to digital will begin. Nationwide digital broadcasting is expected by 2030.

== Holidays ==
=== Regular ===
- January 1 – New Year's Day
- April 13 – Maundy Thursday
- April 14 – Good Friday
- April 9 – Araw ng Kagitingan (Day of Valor)
- May 1 – Labor Day
- June 12 – Independence Day
- August 31 – National Heroes Day
- November 30 – Bonifacio Day
- December 25 – Christmas Day
- December 30 – Rizal Day
- TBA – Eidul Fitr
- TBA – Eidul Adha

=== Special (Non-working) days ===
- February 17 – Chinese New Year
- April 15 – Black Saturday
- August 21 – Ninoy Aquino Day
- November 1 – All Saints Day
- November 2 – All Souls Day
- December 8 – Feast of the Immaculate Conception
- December 24 – Christmas Eve
- December 31 – Last Day of the Year

=== Special (Working) day ===
- February 25 – EDSA People Power Revolution Anniversary

== See also ==
=== Country overviews ===
- History of the Philippines
- History of the Philippines (1986–present)
- Outline of the Philippines
- Government of the Philippines
- Politics of the Philippines
- List of years in the Philippines
- Timeline of Philippine history

=== Related timelines for current period ===
- 2028
- 2028 in politics and government
- 2020s
