= 1935 in the Philippines =

- Decades: 1910s; 1920s; 1930s; 1940s; 1950s
- See also: List of years in the Philippines

1935 in the Philippines details events of note that happened in the Philippines in 1935

== Incumbents ==
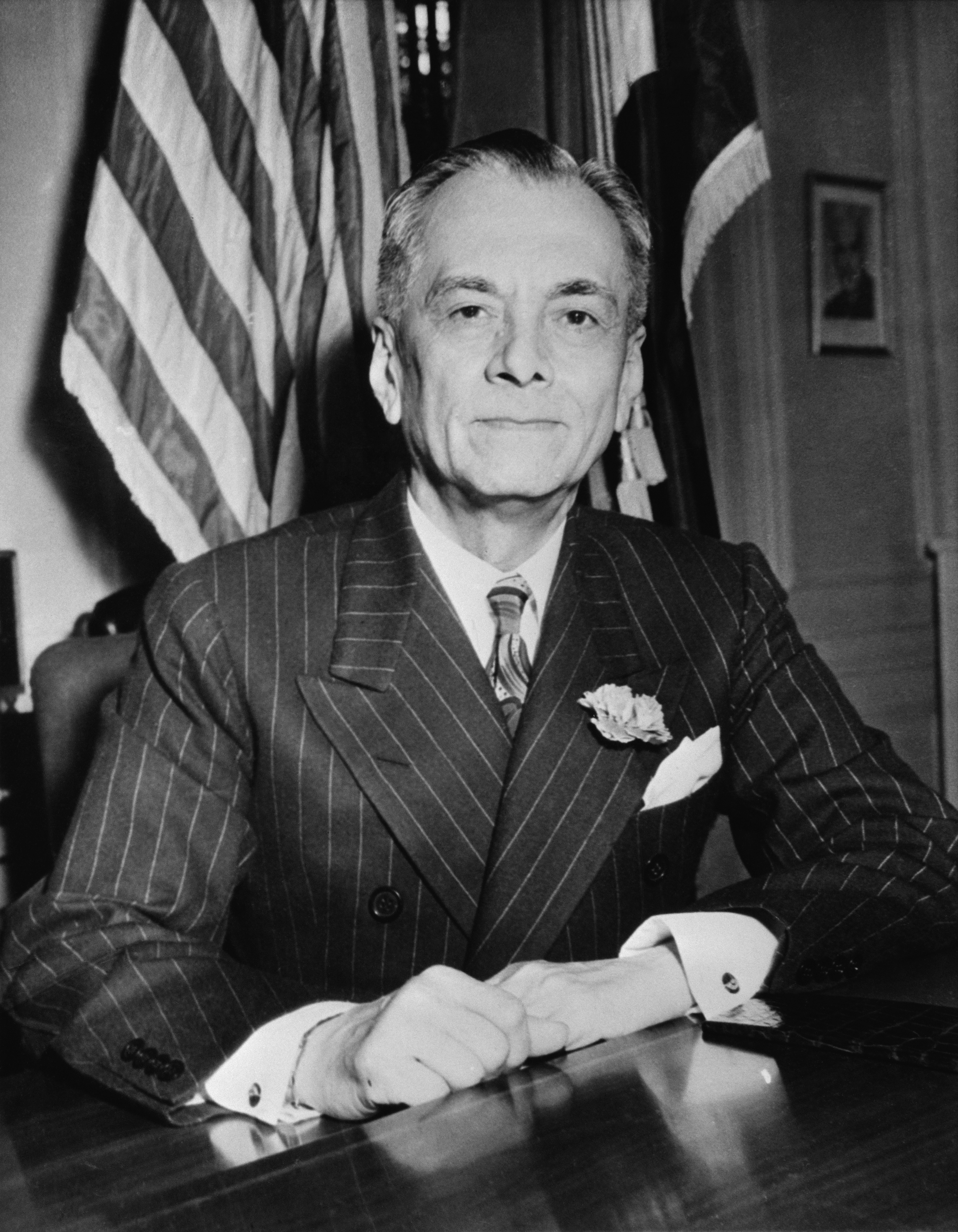
Incoming President Manuel Quezon

- President: Manuel Quezon (Nacionalista Party) (starting November 15)
- Vice President: Sergio Osmeña (Nacionalista Party) (starting November 15)
- Chief Justice: Ramón Avanceña
- Philippine National Assembly: 1st National Assembly of the Philippines (starting November 25)

== Events ==
=== February ===
- February 8 – The Constitutional Convention creates a new constitution.
- February 15 – The Philippine Constitution is signed.

=== May ===
- May 2 – The Sakdalista uprising.
- May 14 – The Philippine electorates ratify the Constitution in a referendum.

=== September ===
- September 16 – Senate president Manuel L. Quezon is elected president in the country's first national election.

=== November ===
- November 15:
  - The Philippine Commonwealth is inaugurated.
  - The Office of Civil Governor is abolished.

=== December ===
- December 15 – The Philippine Army is established through Commonweath Act No. 1.

== Holidays ==
As per Act No. 2711 section 29, issued on March 10, 1917, any legal holiday of fixed date falls on Sunday, the next succeeding day shall be observed as legal holiday. Sundays are also considered legal religious holidays. Bonifacio Day was added through Philippine Legislature Act No. 2946. It was signed by then-Governor General Francis Burton Harrison in 1921. On October 28, 1931, the Act No. 3827 was approved declaring the last Sunday of August as National Heroes Day.

- January 1 – New Year's Day
- February 22 – Legal Holiday
- April 18 – Maundy Thursday
- April 19 – Good Friday
- May 1 – Labor Day
- July 4 – Philippine Republic Day
- August 13 – Legal Holiday
- August 25 – National Heroes Day
- November 28 – Thanksgiving Day
- November 30 – Bonifacio Day
- December 25 – Christmas Day
- December 30 – Rizal Day

== Births ==
- January 17:
  - Sergio Apostol, politician
  - John Henry Osmeña, politician (d. 2021)
- February 11 – Lourdes Libres Rosaroso, radio broadcaster (d. 2010)
- February 15 – Cristobal Ramas, basketball player
- February 26 – Luis Jalandoni, political activist (d. 2025)
- March 23 – Juanita Amatong, member of the Monetary Board of the Philippines
- March 25 – Gabriel Elorde, professional boxer. (d. 1985)
- March 26 – Ernesto Maceda, politician, lawyer, and columnist (d. 2016)
- April 14 – Rodolfo Biazon, politician (d. 2023)
- April 16 – Mely Tagasa, actress, screenwriter and dubbing producer (d. 2018)
- April 25 – Aniano A. Desierto, judge
- June 7 – Roberto Yburan, Olympic basketball player
- June 10 – Eduardo Cojuangco, Jr., politician (d. 2020)
- June 17 – Simeon Datumanong, politician (d. 2017)
- June 23 – Juan Flavier, politician (d. 2014)
- June 27 – Ramon Zamora, film actor (d. 2007)
- June 29 – Pedro Romualdo, politician. (d. 2013)
- July 4 – Cielito del Mundo, host (d. 2016)
- July 13 – Eduardo Ermita, Executive Secretary of the Philippines
- August 16 – Carlos Badion, basketball player (d. 2002)
- August 29 – Luis Villafuerte, politician (d. 2021)
- September 1 – Mel Lopez, politician (d. 2017)
- September 9 — Orly Punzalan, broadcaster (d. 2005)
- September 16 – Lilia Cuntapay, actress (d. 2016)
- September 17 – Romeo A. Brawner, public official (d. 2008)
- October 6 – Charito Solís, actress (d. 1998)
- October 19 – Samuel Dangwa, politician (d. 2019)
- October 20 – Resurreccion Borra, former COMELEC chairman (d. 2020)
- November 6 — Don Pepot, Filipino comedian (d. 2022)
- November 25:
  - Edgar Bond, sports shooter
  - Leonardo Legaspi, Archbishop Emeritus of the Roman Catholic Archdiocese of Caceres (d. 2014)
- December 12 – Epimaco Velasco, politician (d. 2014)
- December 20 – Hilario Davide, Jr., former chief justice

=== Births unknown ===
- Carding Castro, actor (d. 2003)
- Raul Gonzalez, journalist

== Death ==
- September 20 - Julio Nalundasan, Member of the Philippine House of Representatives from Ilocos Norte's Second District (b. 1894)
