= 1936 in the Philippines =

- Decades: 1910s; 1920s; 1930s; 1940s; 1950s
- See also: List of years in the Philippines

1936 in the Philippines details events of note that happened in the Philippines in the year 1936.

== Incumbents ==
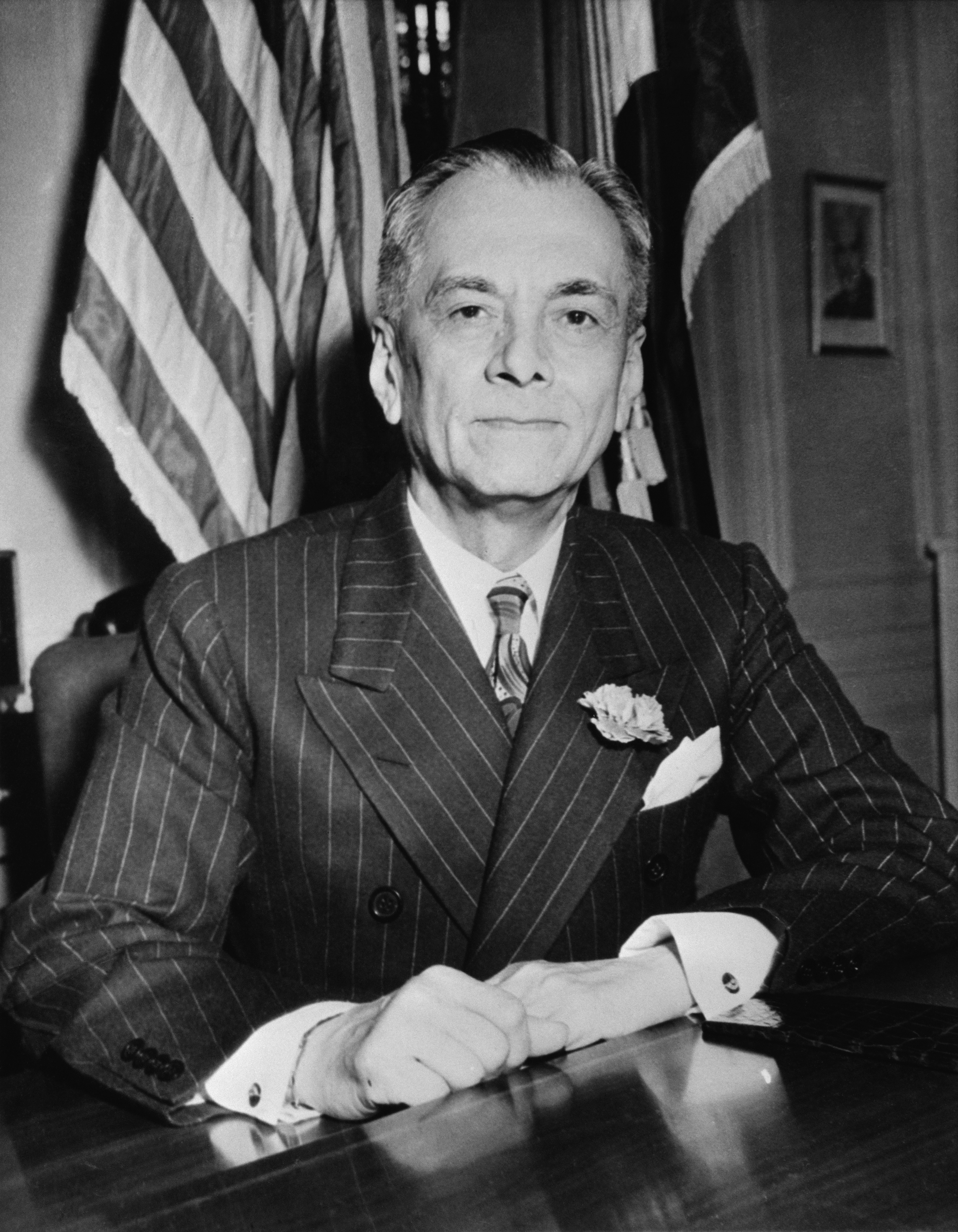
President Manuel Quezon

- President: Manuel L. Quezon (Nacionalista Party)
- Vice President: Sergio Osmeña (Nacionalista Party)
- Chief Justice: Ramón Avanceña
- Philippine National Assembly: 1st National Assembly of the Philippines

== Events ==
=== March ===
- March 25 – President Manuel L. Quezon issues Executive Order No. 23 which provided for the technical description and specifications of the Philippine national flag.

=== August ===
- August 1-16 – The Philippines competed at the 1936 Summer Olympics in Berlin, Germany. 28 competitors, all men, take part in 20 events in 6 sports.

== Holidays ==
As per Act No. 2711 section 29, issued on March 10, 1917, any legal holiday of fixed date falls on Sunday, the next succeeding day shall be observed as legal holiday. Sundays are also considered legal religious holidays. Bonifacio Day was added through Philippine Legislature Act No. 2946. It was signed by then-Governor General Francis Burton Harrison in 1921. On October 28, 1931, the Act No. 3827 was approved declaring the last Sunday of August as National Heroes Day.

- January 1 – New Year's Day
- February 22 – Legal Holiday
- April 9 – Maundy Thursday
- April 10 – Good Friday
- May 1 – Labor Day
- July 4 – Philippine Republic Day
- August 13 – Legal Holiday
- August 30 – National Heroes Day
- November 26 – Thanksgiving Day
- November 30 – Bonifacio Day
- December 25 – Christmas Day
- December 30 – Rizal Day

== Births ==
- January 6 - Nida Blanca, Filipina actress (d. 2001)
- January 14 - Abdulmari Imao, National Artist of the Philippines for Sculpture. (d. 2014)
- April 3 - Louie Beltran, Filipino columnist (d. 1994)
- April 6 – Boy Asistio, former mayor of Caloocan (d. 2017)
- July 18 - Kurt Bachmann, Olympic basketball player (d. 2014)
- October 2 - Feliciano Belmonte, Jr., member of the Philippine House of Representatives
- December 26 - Jose de Venecia, Jr., Filipino businessman and Former Speaker of the House of Representatives of the Philippines (d. 2026)
