= 1919 in the Philippines =

- Decades: 1890s; 1900s; 1910s; 1920s; 1930s
- See also: List of years in the Philippines

1919 in the Philippines details notable events that happened in the Philippines during that year.

== Events ==
=== May ===
- May 12-16 – Far Eastern Championship Games is hosted in Manila, Philippines.

=== September ===
- September 19 – The silent film Dalagang Bukid by José Nepomuceno is released. It is the first film to be produced locally.

== Holidays ==
As per Act No. 2711 section 29, issued on March 10, 1917, any legal holiday of fixed date falls on Sunday, the next succeeding day shall be observed as legal holiday. Sundays are also considered legal religious holidays.

- January 1 – New Year's Day
- February 22 – Legal Holiday
- April 17 – Maundy Thursday
- April 18 – Good Friday
- May 1 – Labor Day
- May 30 – Legal Holiday
- July 4 – Legal Holiday
- August 13 – Legal Holiday
- November 27 – Thanksgiving Day
- December 25 – Christmas Day
- December 30 – Rizal Day

== Births ==
- April 22 - Edith Tiempo, poet (d. 2011)
- August 8 - Ciriaco Cañete, martial artist (d. 2016)
- October 13 - Eddie del Mar, actor (d. 1986)

== Deaths ==
- February 19 - Melchora Aquino, revolutionary, (b. 1812)
- February 20 - Francisco Tongio Liongson, Politician, (b. 1869)
