= Batang Pinoy =

National youth sports competition of the Philippines

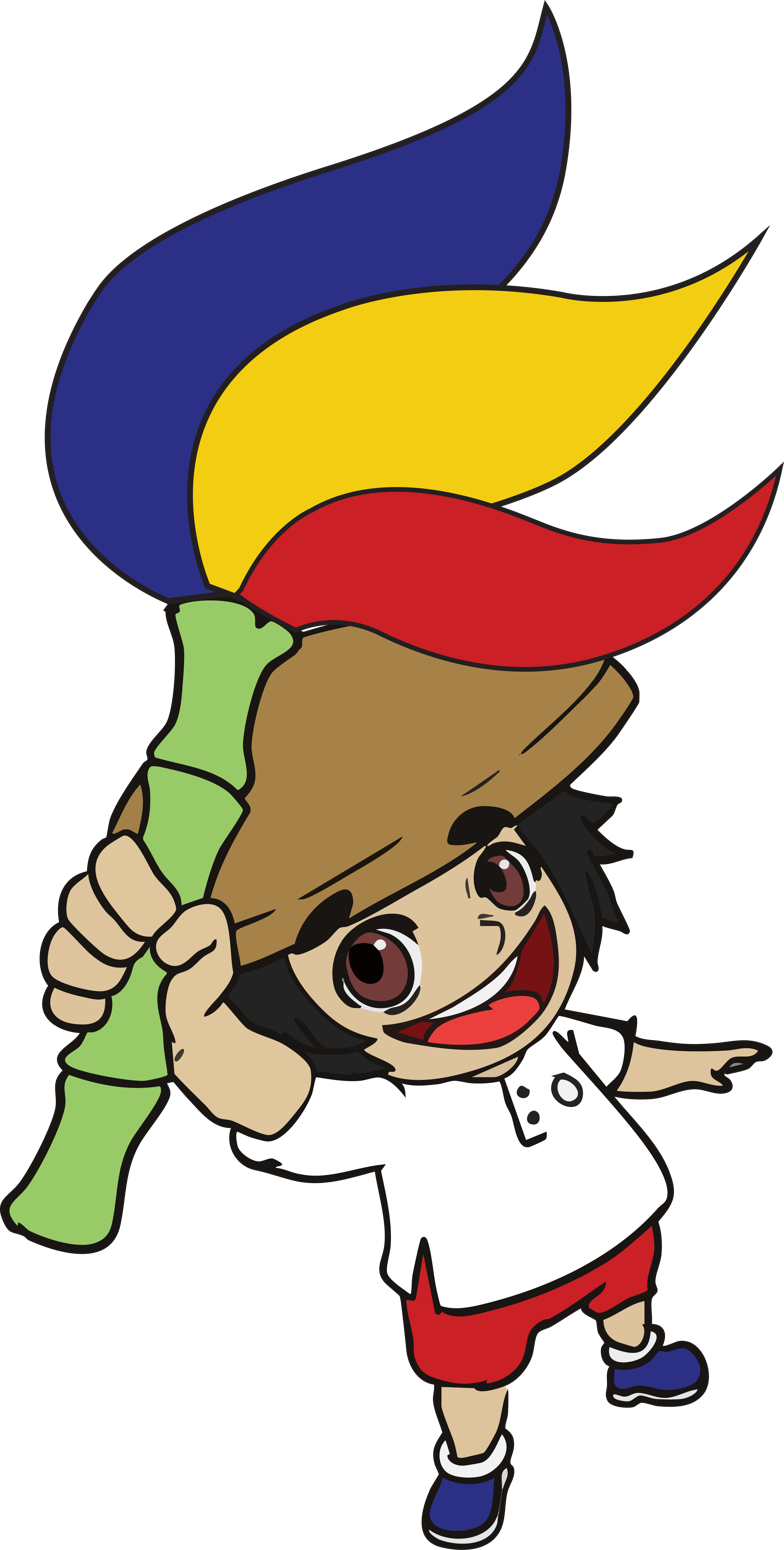
- Abbreviation: PYG-Batang Pinoy
- Purpose: National games for athletes ages eight to 15 years old; under 12 years old and below (1999–2001); under 17 years old and below (2011–2026)
- Frequency: Annually
- Inaugurated: 1999 in Bacolod
- Most recent: 2025 in General Santos
- Next event: 2026 in Bacolod
- Website: batangpinoy.psc.gov.ph

The Philippine Youth Games – Batang Pinoy or simply Batang Pinoy (lit. 'Filipino Youth') is the national youth sports competition of the Philippines for athletes ages eight to 15 years old. Unlike the Palarong Pambansa a competition for student athletes, the Batang Pinoy also includes the out-of-school youth.

== History ==
The Batang Pinoy was established through the Executive Order No. 44 which was signed by then President Joseph Estrada on December 2, 1998. The first edition was held in Bacolod in 1999. From then, the games were held annually with Santa Cruz, Laguna (2000), Bacolod (2001) Puerto Princesa (2002) hosting the next three editions. The 2002 and prior editions, were for athletes of 12 years and below.

In 2003, the Philippine Sports Commission decided to put the competition, along with its other national competitions, on hold so the sports body could reallocate funds to the national teams' stint at the Southeast Asian Games. The Batang Pinoy was held again in 2011, and is held annually since then.

In 2017, the prospects of ending the organization of Batang Pinoy was raised due to it being redundant to the Palarong Pambansa, another national games but for student-athletes below 18 years of age.

In 2020, Batang Pinoy was cancelled due to the COVID-19 pandemic in the Philippines. Last held in 2019 in Puerto Princesa, the Batang Pinoy resumed in 2022 in Vigan, Ilocos Sur.

Starting the 2026 edition in Bacolod, the age limit was revised to cover athletes 8 to 15 years old. The adjustment was made due to the SEA Plus Youth Games being an under-16 tournament.

== Editions ==
Host of the Batang Pinoy National Championships.

Location of the Batang Pinoy hosts
Bacolod: 1st, 3rd, 7th, 8th, 17th

Edition	Year	Main host
1st	1999	Bacolod
2nd	2000	Santa Cruz, Laguna
3rd	2001	Bacolod
4th	2002	Puerto Princesa
Not held from 2003 to 2010.
5th	2011	Naga, Camarines Sur
6th	2012	Iloilo City
7th	2013*	Bacolod
8th	2014	Bacolod
9th	2015	Cebu City
10th	2016	Tagum
11th	2018	Baguio
12th	2019	Puerto Princesa
Not held from 2020 to 2021.
13th	2022	Vigan
14th	2023	Manila
15th	2024	Puerto Princesa
16th	2025	General Santos
17th	2026	Bacolod

(*) Hosting of the originally 2013 edition postponed to early 2014. A second Batang Pinoy was hosted in the same year.

== See also ==
- Palarong Pambansa
- Philippine National Games
