= 1914 in the Philippines =

- Decades: 1890s; 1900s; 1910s; 1920s; 1930s
- See also: List of years in the Philippines

1914 in the Philippines details events of note that happened in the Philippines in the year 1914.

== Events ==
=== July ===
- July 23 – The province of Moro is dissolved.
- July 27 – Iglesia ni Cristo is registered to the government by Felix Manalo.

=== September ===
- September 1:
  - The province of Cotabato is founded.
  - The province of Davao is founded.

== Holidays ==
As per Act No. 345 issued on February 1, 1902, any legal holiday of fixed date falls on Sunday, the next succeeding day shall be observed as legal holiday. Sundays are also considered legal religious holidays.

- January 1 – New Year's Day
- February 22 – Legal Holiday
- April 9 – Maundy Thursday
- April 10 – Good Friday
- July 4 – Legal Holiday
- August 13 – Legal Holiday
- November 26 – Thanksgiving Day
- December 25 – Christmas Day
- December 30 – Rizal Day

== Births ==
- March 3 - Teofilo Camomot, Roman Catholic bishop, servant of God (d. 1988)
- June 25 - Luz Magsaysay, 7th First Lady of the Philippines (d. 2004)
- June 27 - Helena Benitez, senator, chairman and founder of Philippine Women's University (d. 2016)
