= 1907 in the Philippines =

- Decades: 1880s; 1890s; 1900s; 1910s; 1920s
- See also: List of years in the Philippines

1907 in the Philippines details events of note that happened in the Philippines in the year 1907.

== Events ==
=== June ===
- June 3 – Centro Escolar University established as Centro Escolar de Señoritas.

=== July ===
- July 30 – First Philippine Assembly elections were held.

=== August ===
- August 20 – The province of Agusan is founded.

=== September ===
- September 13 – Macario Sakay was executed in Manila.

=== October ===
- October 16 – The First Philippine Assembly was held in the old Manila Grand Opera House.

=== Date unknown ===
- The Philippine Football Federation is established.

== Holidays ==
As per Act No. 345 issued on February 1, 1902, if any legal holiday of fixed date falls on Sunday, the next succeeding day shall be observed as a legal holiday. Sundays are also considered legal religious holidays.

- January 1 – New Year's Day
- February 22 – Legal Holiday
- March 28 – Maundy Thursday
- March 29 – Good Friday
- July 4 – Legal Holiday
- August 13 – Legal Holiday
- November 28 – Thanksgiving Day
- December 25 – Christmas Day
- December 30 – Rizal Day

== Death ==
- September 13 - Macario Sakay, Filipino Revolutionary.
