= 1961 in the Philippines =

- Decades: 1940s; 1950s; 1960s; 1970s; 1980s
- See also: List of years in the Philippines; films

1961 in the Philippines details events of note that happened in the Philippines in the year 1961.

== Incumbents ==
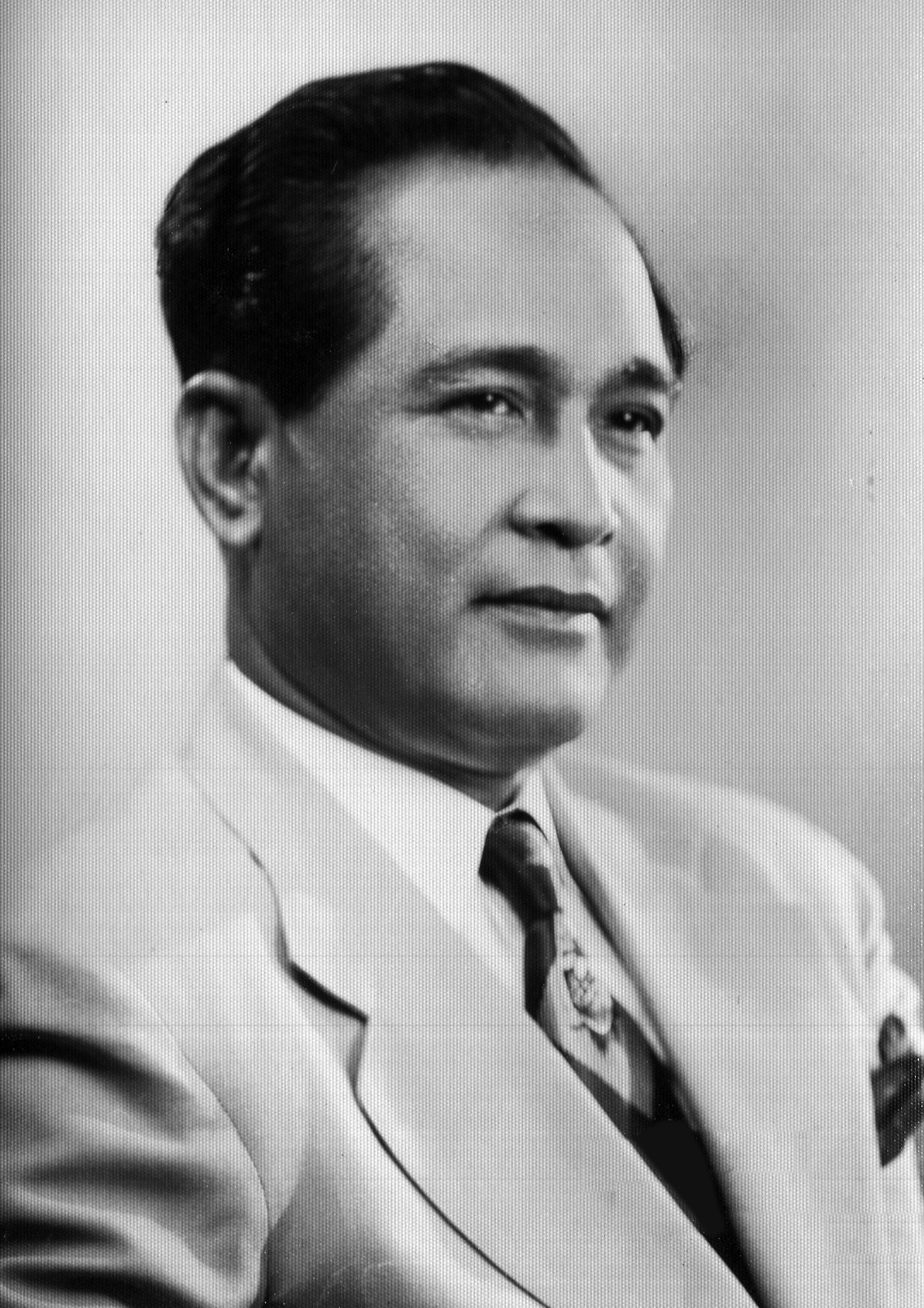
Outgoing President Carlos P. Garcia

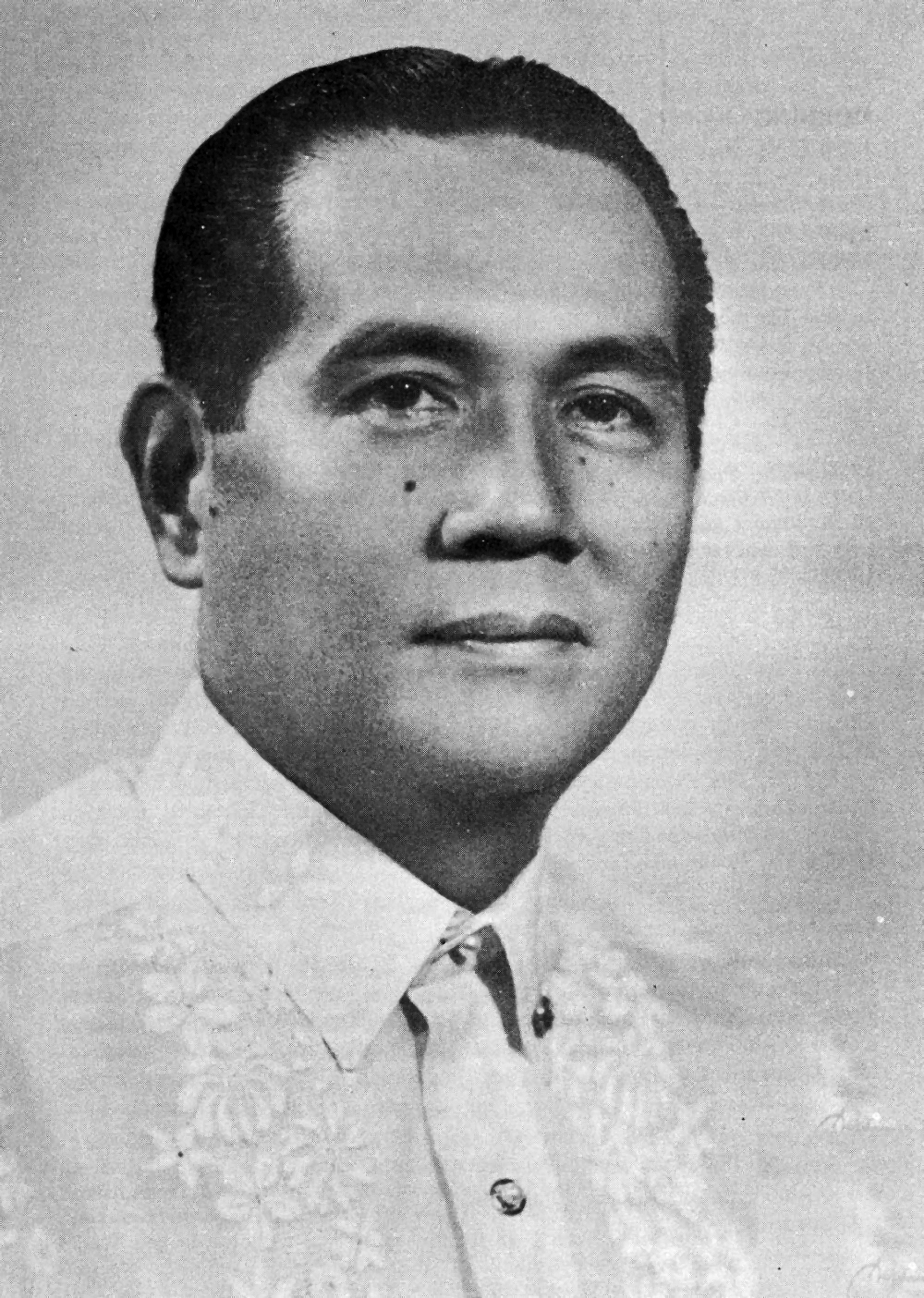
Incoming President Diosdado Macapagal

- President:
  - Carlos P. Garcia (Nacionalista Party) (until December 30)
  - Diosdado Macapagal (Liberal) (starting December 30)
- Vice President:
  - Diosdado Macapagal (Liberal) (until December 30)
  - Emmanuel Pelaez (Liberal) (starting December 30)
- Chief Justice:
  - Ricardo Paras (until February 17)
  - César Bengzon (starting April 28)
- Congress: 4th (until December 13)

== Events ==
=== January ===
- January 18 – Baguio experiences cold at 6.3-degree Celsius, the country's lowest temperature on record.

=== April ===
- April 6 – April 9 is proclaimed as Bataan Day and declared it as legal holiday.

=== June ===
- June 7 – Danao becomes a city in the province of Cebu through Republic Act 3028 and ratified on the same day.

=== November ===
- November 14 – Caloocan becomes a city in the province of Rizal through ratification of Republic Act 3278.

=== December ===
- December 7 – Diosdado Macapagal is elected president in the presidential elections.
- December 30 – Macapagal takes his oath of office.
- December 31 – Lapu-Lapu becomes a city in the province of Cebu through ratification of Republic Act 3134 which was approved last June 17.

== Holidays ==
As per Act No. 2711 section 29, issued on March 10, 1917, any legal holiday of fixed date falls on Sunday, the next succeeding day shall be observed as legal holiday. Sundays are also considered legal religious holidays. Bonifacio Day was added through Philippine Legislature Act No. 2946. It was signed by then-Governor General Francis Burton Harrison in 1921. On October 28, 1931, the Act No. 3827 was approved declaring the last Sunday of August as National Heroes Day. As per Republic Act No. 3022, April 9 is proclaimed as Bataan Day.

- January 1 – New Year's Day
- February 22 – Legal Holiday
- March 31 – Maundy Thursday
- April 1 – Good Friday
- April 9 – Araw ng Kagitingan (Day of Valor)
- May 1 – Labor Day
- July 4 – Philippine Republic Day
- August 13 – Legal Holiday
- August 27 – National Heroes Day
- November 23 – Thanksgiving Day
- November 30 – Bonifacio Day
- December 25 – Christmas Day
- December 30 – Rizal Day

== Entertainment and culture ==
- October 29 – DZBB-TV Channel 7 of the Republic Broadcasting System (now GMA Network), the country's television station owned by Robert Stewart is launched.

== Births ==
- January 9 – Henry Omaga-Diaz, Filipino journalist
- January 27 - Willie Revillame, Filipino TV host/comedian
- February 6 – Susan Quimpo, Filipino activist, author, and theater artist (d. 2020)
- March 27 – Peter John Calderon, Filipino lawyer and politician
- March 31 – Jesus Crispin Remulla, Filipino politician
- April 9 – April Boy Regino, Filipino singer (d. 2020)
- April 19 – Albert Martinez, Filipino actor and director
- May 29 – Ali Sotto, Filipino actress, and radio broadcaster
- May 30 – Ricky Davao, Filipino actor and director (d. 2025)
- July 2 – Tetchie Agbayani, Filipina actress
- July 18 – Howie Severino, Filipino broadcast journalist
- June 19 – Joel Torre, Filipino actor
- July 22 – Dulce, Filipina singer
- August 13 – Ambeth R. Ocampo, Filipino historian, journalist, and writer
- September 23 – Joey Loyzaga, Basketball player.
- September 25 – Mark Gil, actor (d. 2014)
- October 5 – Rommel Amatong, Filipino politician
- October 3 - Rio Locsin, Filipino actress
- October 11 – Willie Marcial, 10th PBA commissioner
- October 26:
  - Eduardo Año, Secretary of the Interior and Local Government
  - Joey Salceda, Filipino politician
- December 2 – Rodrigo Abellanosa, Filipino politician
- December 13 – Amy Austria, Filipino actress
- December 22 – Lan Medina, Filipino comic book artist
- December 23 – Lorna Tolentino, Filipino actress
- December 24 – Armin Luistro, former secretary of Education, superior general of the Institute of the Brothers of the Christian Schools

== Deaths ==
- July 21 – Boy Sta. Romana, actor (b. 1936)
- October 1 – Mariano Garchitorena, politician (b. 1898)
- October 19 – Sergio Osmeña, 4th President of the Philippines (b. 1878)
