= 2027 in Philippine sports =

The following is a list of notable events and developments related to Philippine sports in 2027.

== Events ==
=== Scheduled dates ===
- March 28 – April 5 – The Philippines men's national team will participate at the 2027 World Men's Curling Championship in Saint John, New Brunswick, Canada.
- June 24 – July 25 – The Philippines women's national team will participate at the 2027 FIFA Women's World Cup in Brazil.
- July 1–10 – The Philippines men's national team will participate at the 2027 World Lacrosse Men's Championship in Japan.
- July 11–18 – The country will host the 2027 FIBA Women's Asia Cup at SM Seaside Cebu Arena in Cebu City.
- October 5–11 – The Philippines men's and wommen's national teams will participate 2027 World Lacrosse Sixes Championships in Colorado Springs, Colorado, United States.
- December 2–14 – The country will host the 2027 SEA Plus Youth Games.

==== Date unknown ====
- The country will host the Asian Beach Games (ABG).

== See also ==
- 2027 in the Philippines
- 2027 in sports
