= 1964 in the Philippines =

- Decades: 1940s; 1950s; 1960s; 1970s; 1980s
- See also: List of years in the Philippines; films

1964 in the Philippines details events of note that happened in the Philippines in the year 1964.

== Incumbents ==
- President: Diosdado Macapagal (Liberal)
- Vice President: Emmanuel Pelaez (Liberal)
- Chief Justice: César Bengzon
- Congress: 5th

== Events ==
- May 20 - Philippine Airlines Flight 26/25 crashed en route to Zamboanga Airport, Zamboanga killing all 11 people.
- August 4 - Diosdado Macapagal signed the Republic Act No. 4166, thus proclaimed June 12 as "Philippine Independence Day".

== Holidays ==
As per Act No. 2711 section 29, issued on March 10, 1917, any legal holiday of fixed date falls on Sunday, the next succeeding day shall be observed as legal holiday. Sundays are also considered legal religious holidays. Bonifacio Day was added through Philippine Legislature Act No. 2946. It was signed by then-Governor General Francis Burton Harrison in 1921. On October 28, 1931, the Act No. 3827 was approved declaring the last Sunday of August as National Heroes Day. As per Republic Act No. 3022, April 9 is proclaimed as Bataan Day. Independence Day was changed from July 4 (Philippine Republic Day) to June 12 (Philippine Independence Day) on August 4, 1964.

- January 1 – New Year's Day
- February 22 – Legal Holiday
- April 9 – Bataan Day
- April 15 – Maundy Thursday
- April 16 – Good Friday
- May 1 – Labor Day
- June 12 – Independence Day
- July 4 – Philippine Republic Day
- August 13 – Legal Holiday
- August 29 – National Heroes Day
- November 26 – Thanksgiving Day
- November 30 – Bonifacio Day
- December 25 – Christmas Day
- December 30 – Rizal Day

== Births ==
- January 2 - Noel Rosal, businessman, former councilor and mayor of Legazpi City and governor of Albay
- January 10 - Jestoni Alarcon, Filipino actor and Politician
- January 11 - Ralph Recto, former senator and politician
- January 12 - Bentong, actor and comedian (d. 2019)
- January 15 - Janet Lim-Napoles, Filipino businesswoman
- January 20 - Koko Pimentel, Senator and Politician
- February 11 - Jackie Lou Blanco, Filipino actress
- March 1 - Gino Padilla, Filipino OPM singer and songwriter
- March 10 - Jojo Lastimosa, Filipino professional basketball coach and former player.
- March 17 - Arnell Ignacio, Filipino television personality, actor, singer-songwriter, and public official
- March 27 - Jessica Soho, Filipino broadcast journalist
- March 31 - Benjie Liwanag, was last seen as the Senior Vice President for Radio Operations of the Abante-Bilyonaryo Group, and was a longtime anchor and senior reporter for GMA Network's flagship AM radio station, DZBB, where he anchored programs such as "Liwanag sa Balita" (d. 2025)
- April 11 - Beverly Vergel, Filipino-Canadian actress and film writer, director and producer
- May 26 - Chito Gascon, Filipino lawyer, civic organizer, and human rights activist (d. 2021)
- May 28 - Zsa Zsa Padilla, Filipino actress and Singer
- June 1 - Jainal Antel Sali Jr., was a Filipino militant who was a senior leader of Abu Sayyaf, an Islamist terrorist organization affiliated with Al Qaeda (d. 2007)
- June 1 - Boy Cabahug, is a retired Filipino professional basketball player in the Philippine Basketball Association[1] and the former head coach of the University of the Visayas Green Lancers varsity team.[2] * June 14 - Gibo Teodoro, Filipino lawyer, politician and business executive
- June 19 - Hector Begeo, is a three-time Olympian representing the Philippines. He is the national record holder in the men's 3000 metres steeplechase. He also placed second in the 1983 Asian Athletics Championships and third in the steeplechase at the 1982 Asian Games. He is the only Filipino to advance to the semi-finals in the 3000 m Steeplechase in an Olympic event during the 1988 Seoul Olympics. He also represented the Philippines at the 1997 World Championships in Athletics.
- July 3 - Regina Reyes Mandanas, Filipino politician who served as the Representative of Marinduque's lone district from 2013 to 2016 (d. 2022)
- July 16 - Melanie Marquez, is a Filipino actress and beauty queen who won Miss International 1979.[1]
- July 27 - Melissa Mendez, Filipino film and TV actress
- August 6 - Gary Valenciano, Filipino actor and singer
- August 10 – Erwin Tulfo, politician, news anchor and columnist
- September 2 - Archie Gamboa, Former Director for Comptrollership of the Philippine National Police
- September 5 - Pido Jarencio, is a Filipino basketball coach and former professional player. He is the head coach for the UST Growling Tigers of the University Athletic Association of the Philippines (UAAP). He had coached UST previously from 2006 to 2013; he won the UAAP title in his first season and was named UAAP Coach of the Year. He is also the board governor for the Terrafirma Dyip of the Philippine Basketball Association (PBA).[1]
- September 12 - Angela Laprete, With over 30 years of production experience in Hawaii's TV and Film industry, Angela has worked on all types of projects from commercials and music videos to episodic TV, indies, and feature film productions.
- September 20 - Rita Avila, Filipino actress and author
- October 4 - Francis Magalona, Filipino rapper (d. 2009)
- October 5 - Korina Sanchez-Roxas, Filipino broadcaster
- October 11 - Ricardo Cepeda, Filipino actor and Action Star
- October 30 - Harvey Diez, Filipino actor and businessman (d. 2010)
- November 3 - Susan Yap, Filipino politician who is the mayor of Tarlac City since 2025. She served as the 32nd governor of Tarlac in the Philippines from 2016 to 2025. She previously represented the 2nd district of Tarlac in the Philippine House of Representatives from 2010 to 2016. Yap is a member of the NPC, the older sister of former governor Victor Yap and the daughter of former governor Jose “Aping” Yap Sr.
- November 5 - Gabby Concepcion, Filipino actor
- November 10 - Camilo Cascolan, Filipino police general who served as the 24th Chief of the Philippine National Police (PNP) (d. 2023)
- November 11 - Ai-Ai delas Alas, Filipino actress singer comedienne
- November 20 - Arnell Tamayo, Filipino actor, comedian tv host
- November 29 - Raymond Lauchengco, Filipino actor and singer
- December 18 - Yves Dignadice, Filipino former professional basketball player who spent fourteen seasons in the Philippine Basketball Association, mostly with the San Miguel Beermen.
- December 19 - Joseph Santiago, is a Filipino politician. A member of the Nationalist People's Coalition, he has been elected to three terms as a Member of the House of Representatives of the Philippines, representing the Lone District of Catanduanes. First elected in 2001, he was re-elected in 2004 and 2007.
- December 26 - Lydia de Vega, Athlete (d. 2022)
- December 26 - Ferjenel Biron, is a Filipino politician and physician. Since 2004, he has served multiple terms in the Congress of the Philippines as a representative from Iloilo. He is the founder of the Pharmawealth Group of Companies and was the Chief Executive Officer until his election to Congress in 2004. Biron was elected as a member of the Commission on Appointments on August 8, 2022

== Deaths ==
- February 6 - Emilio Aguinaldo, Philippine president (born 1869)
- December 9 - Eulogio Rodriguez, was a Filipino politician who twice served as President of the Senate of the Philippines. He was known for vehemently confronting corruption during the administration of Carlos P. Garcia, alleging he held a list of corrupt officials close to the president which the media dubbed the "White Paper".[2][3] (born 1883)
