= Abadiano (surname) =

Abadiano is a Basque surname. Notable people with the surname include:

- Benjamin Abadiano (born 1963), Filipino lexicographer
- Gerry Abadiano (born 2001), Filipino basketball player
- Luis Abadiano (1789–1854), Mexican publisher and printer
