= 1965 in the Philippines =

- Decades: 1940s; 1950s; 1960s; 1970s; 1980s
- See also: List of years in the Philippines; films

1965 in the Philippines details events of note that happened in the Philippines in 1965.

== Incumbents ==
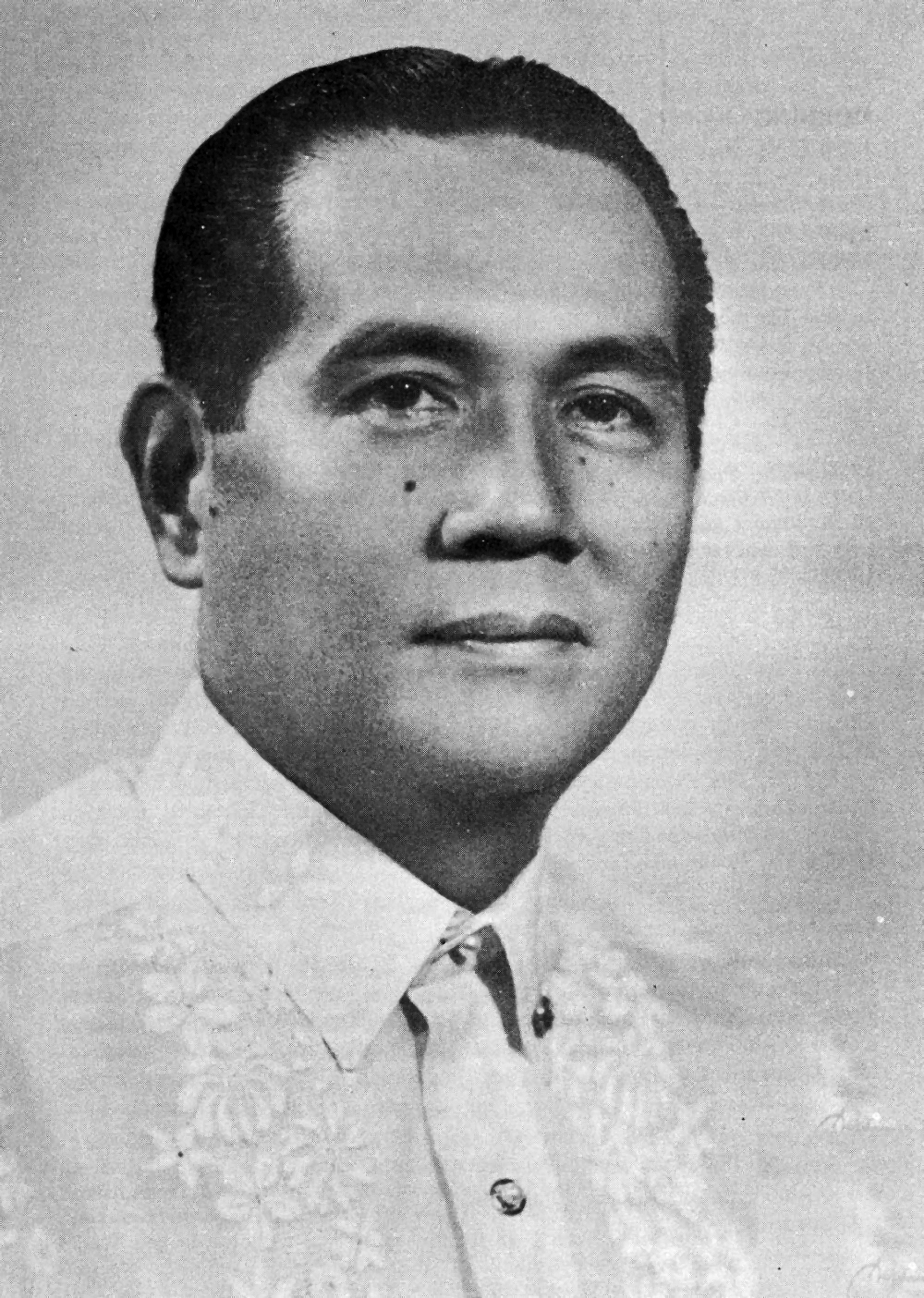
Outgoing President Diosdado Macapagal

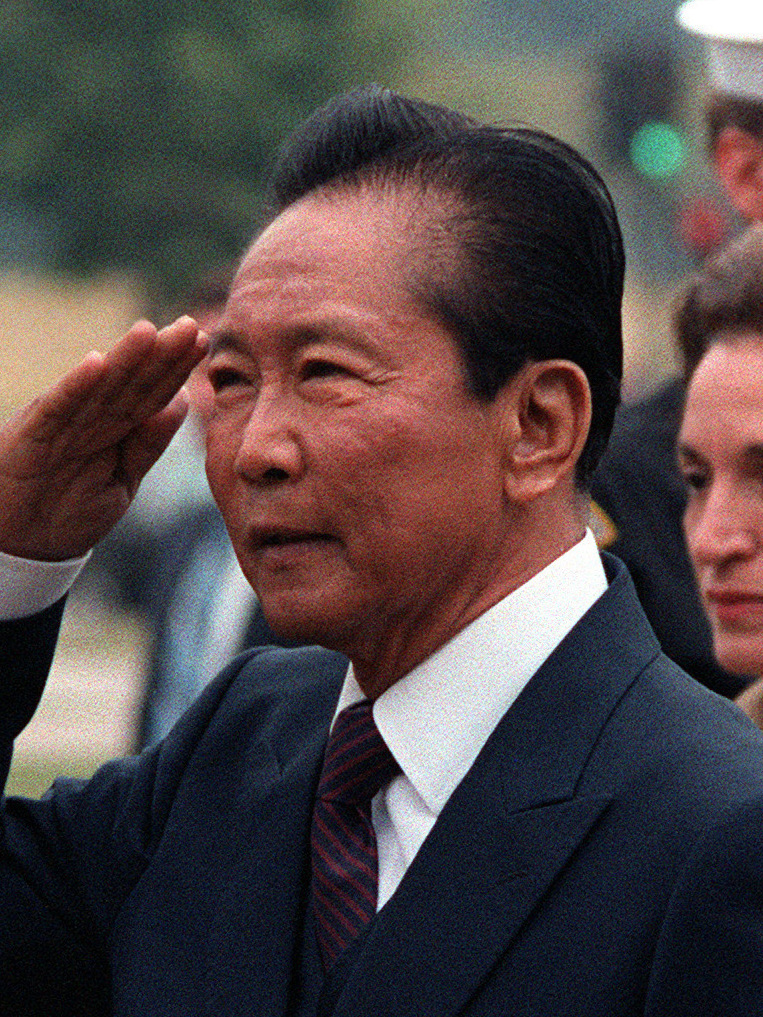
Incoming President Ferdinand Marcos

- President:
  - Diosdado Macapagal (Liberal) (until December 30)
  - Ferdinand Marcos (Nacionalista) (starting December 30)
- Vice President:
  - Emmanuel Pelaez (Nacionalista) (until December 30)
  - Fernando Lopez (Nacionalista) (starting December 30)
- Chief Justice: César Bengzon
- Congress: 5th (until December 17)

== Events ==
=== June ===
- June 19 – The provinces of Eastern Samar, Northern Samar and Western Samar are created after approval of Republic Act 4221.

=== September ===
- September 28 – Taal Volcano erupts killing hundreds.

=== October ===
- October 19 – The Philippine Benevolent Missionaries Association (PBMA) is established with its office in San Jose, Dinagat Islands.

=== November ===
- November 9:
  - Bago becomes a city in the province of Negros Occidental through ratification of Republic Act 4382.
  - Ferdinand Marcos is elected president during the presidential elections.
  - San Carlos becomes a city in the province of Pangasinan through ratification of Republic Act 4487.
  - Laoag becomes a city in the province of Ilocos Norte through ratification of Republic Act 4584.
  - La Carlota becomes a city in the province of Negros Occidental through ratification of Republic Act 4585.
  - Batangas becomes a city in the province of Batangas through ratification of Republic Act 4586.

=== December ===
- December 30 – Ferdinand Marcos and Fernando Lopez are inaugurated the country's president and vice-president, respectively.

== Holidays ==
As per Act No. 2711 section 29, issued on March 10, 1917, any legal holiday of fixed date falls on Sunday, the next succeeding day shall be observed as legal holiday. Sundays are also considered legal religious holidays. Bonifacio Day was added through Philippine Legislature Act No. 2946. It was signed by then-Governor General Francis Burton Harrison in 1921. On October 28, 1931, the Act No. 3827 was approved declaring the last Sunday of August as National Heroes Day. As per Republic Act No. 3022, April 9 is proclaimed as Bataan Day. Independence Day was changed from July 4 (Philippine Republic Day) to June 12 (Philippine Independence Day) on August 4, 1964.

- January 1 – New Year's Day
- February 22 – Legal Holiday
- April 9 – Bataan Day
- April 15 – Maundy Thursday
- April 16 – Good Friday
- May 1 – Labor Day
- June 12 – Independence Day
- July 4 – Philippine Republic Day
- August 13 – Legal Holiday
- August 29 – National Heroes Day
- November 25 – Thanksgiving Day
- November 30 – Bonifacio Day
- December 25 – Christmas Day
- December 30 – Rizal Day

== Births ==
- January – Anthony Pangilinan, businessman and media personality
- January 4 – Rommel Padilla, actor and politician
- January 5 – Carlo Lopez, former member of the House of Representatives from Manila's 2nd district
- February 20 – Nilo Divina, lawyer
- February 22 – Wilfredo Alicdan, artist
- February 25 – Maricel Soriano, actress
- February 28 – Shamaine Buencamino, Filipino actress
- April 23 – Leni Robredo, lawyer, 14th Vice President of the Philippines and current mayor of Naga City, Camarines Sur
- May 6 – Honey Lacuna, politician
- May 11 – Monsour del Rosario, Olympic athlete and actor
- June 10 – Joey Santiago, guitarist and composer.
- June 21 – Marlon Maro, football player and coach
- October 19 – Jopet Sison, Filipino lawyer, TV presenter, and politician
- November 2 – Arnold Clavio, journalist and radio anchor
- November 10 – Arthur C. Yap, politician.
- November 12 – Caloy Loria, businessman and politician
- November 18 – Sarsi Emmanuelle, former actress and dancer
- December 27 – Luchi Cruz-Valdes, broadcast journalist

== Deaths ==
- February 9 – Joaquín Miguel Elizalde, Filipino diplomat and businessman (b. 1896)
- March 22 – Daniel Z. Romualdez, Filipino politician (b. 1907)
- May 14 – Francisco Alonso Liongson, Filipino writer and lawyer (b. 1896)
- May 16 – Pablo Angeles y David, Filipino magistrate and statesman. (b. 1889)
- September 20 – Cipriano Primicias, Sr., Filipino politician (b. 1901)
