= 1962 in the Philippines =

- Decades: 1940s; 1950s; 1960s; 1970s; 1980s
- See also: List of years in the Philippines; films

1962 in the Philippines details events of note that happened in the Philippines in the year 1962.

== Incumbents ==
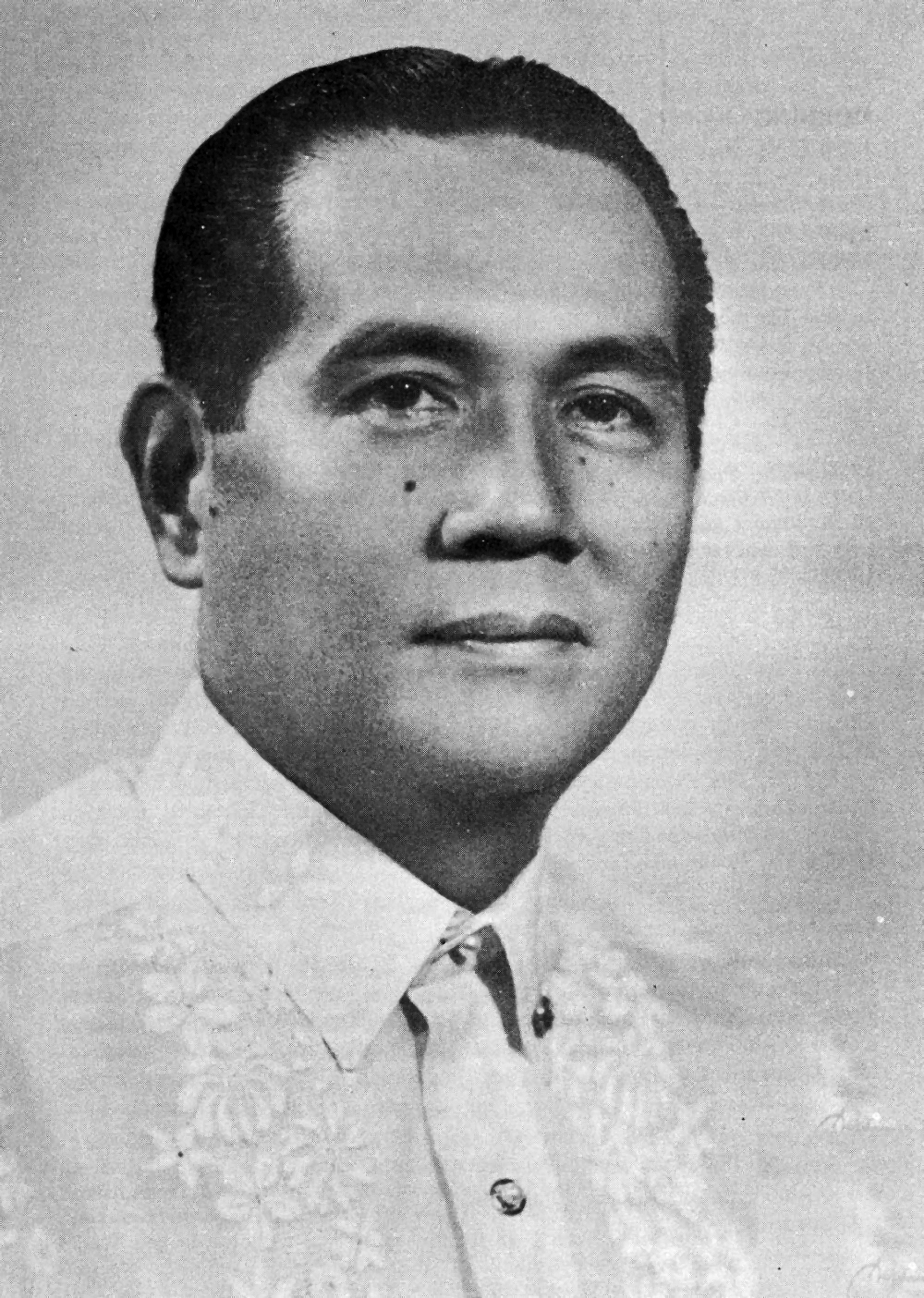
President Diosdado Macapagal

- President: Diosdado Macapagal (Liberal)
- Vice President: Emmanuel Pelaez (Liberal)
- Chief Justice: César Bengzon
- Congress: 5th (starting January 22)

== Events ==
=== February ===
- February 16 – Caloocan becomes a city in the province of Rizal through Republic Act No. 3278.

=== May ===
- May 12 – Diosdado Macapagal changes the date of the commemoration of Philippine Independence from July 4 to June 12.

== Holidays ==
As per Act No. 2711 section 29, issued on March 10, 1917, any legal holiday of fixed date falls on Sunday, the next succeeding day shall be observed as legal holiday. Sundays are also considered legal religious holidays. Bonifacio Day was added through Philippine Legislature Act No. 2946. It was signed by then-Governor General Francis Burton Harrison in 1921. On October 28, 1931, the Act No. 3827 was approved declaring the last Sunday of August as National Heroes Day. As per Republic Act No. 3022, April 9 is proclaimed as Bataan Day.

- January 1 – New Year's Day
- February 22 – Legal Holiday
- April 9 – Araw ng Kagitingan (Day of Valor)
- April 19 – Maundy Thursday
- April 20 – Good Friday
- May 1 – Labor Day
- July 4 – Philippine Republic Day
- August 13 – Legal Holiday
- August 26 – National Heroes Day
- November 22 – Thanksgiving Day
- November 30 – Bonifacio Day
- December 25 – Christmas Day
- December 30 – Rizal Day

== Births ==
- January 8 – John Castriciones, lawyer, public servant, writer
- January 21 – Ronald dela Rosa, politician and Chief of the Philippine National Police
- January 27 - Dina Bonnevie, actress
- February 9 – Dennis Padilla, actor and comedian.
- March 7 – Irma Adlawan, actress
- March 8 – Jose Jaime Espina, journalist (d. 2021)
- March 15 - Joey Uy, former Manila 6th District councilor
- March 26 – Francisco Emmanuel Ortega III, politician
- March 27 – Roberto Puno, politician
- March 29 – Ted Failon, broadcast journalist
- April 1 – Samboy Lim, basketball player
- April 4 – Roderick Paulate, actor, comedian, and politician
- May 8 – Edwin Lacierda, lawyer and technology entrepreneur
- May 12 – Daniel Fernando, actor and politician
- May 23 – Cathy Cabral, civil engineer and Undersecretary for Planning and Public–Private Partnership of Department of Public Works and Highways (d. 2025)
- June 29 – Paulyn Ubial, physician and former Secretary of Health
- July 2 – Carmelita Abalos, politician
- August 1 – Cesar Montano, actor and director
- August 11 – Mel Senen Sarmiento, politician
- September 14 - Soliman Cruz, actor
- October 15 – Rolando Joselito Bautista, Secretary of Agrarian Reform
- October 16 – Joseph Cua, politician
- October 22 – Gus Abelgas, journalist
- November 5 – Miguel Rodriguez born Michael Benedict P. Rodriguez (died 1997)
- December 12 – Carlito Galvez Jr., army general
