= 1960 in the Philippines =

- Decades: 1940s; 1950s; 1960s; 1970s; 1980s
- See also: List of years in the Philippines; films

1960 in the Philippines details events of note that happened in the Philippines in the year 1960.

== Incumbents ==
- President: Carlos P. Garcia (Nacionalista Party)
- Vice President: Diosdado Macapagal (Liberal)
- Chief Justice: Ricardo Paras
- Congress: 4th

== Births ==
- January 3 - Francis Tolentino, Filipino politician and lawyer
- January 20 - Shalala, Filipino radio and TV personality and comedian (d. 2021)
- January 21 - Mari Kaimo, Filipino journalist, news anchor, host, television personality, actor, and voice-over artist
- January 22 - Victor Bendico, Prelateoften referred to as Bishop Vic or Monsignor Vic, is a Filipino prelate of the Catholic Church who has been appointed the fourth Metropolitan Archbishop of Capiz.[1] Archbishop Bendico during the Season of Creation mass in Roxas City, Capiz last October 2, 2025 Within the Catholic Bishops' Conference of the Philippines, he chairs the Episcopal Commission for Permanent Diaconate.[1]
- January 28 - Loren Legarda, is a Filipino politician, environmentalist, cultural worker, and former journalist
- February 2 - Lloyd Samartino, Filipino actor
- February 8 - Benigno Aquino III, Filipino politician who served as the 15th president of the Philippines from 2010 to 2016 (d. 2021)
- February 20 - Pierre Patricio, is a Filipino self-taught visual artist. He is known for exhibiting extensively in his home country and internationally, and for representing the Philippines in the first two editions of the United Buddy Bears World Tour Exhibition.
- February 21 - Edgar Chatto, is a Filipino lawyer and politician who served as the representative of the 1st congressional district of Bohol from 2019-2025. He previously served in that position from 2001 to 2010.[2] He served as Governor of the Province of Bohol for three terms from 2010 to 2019.
- March 12 - Raffy Tulfo, Filipino politician, broadcast journalist, and media personality
- March 19 - Joey Albert, Filipino Singer
- March 21 - Benito T. de Leon, is a retired military officer of the Armed Forces of the Philippines (AFP). While a Roman Catholic, he was conferred the rare Muslim-Maranao honorary title of Sultan a Romapunut[2] for his peace efforts.[3][4] De León held the Philippine Army rank of major general and was the commander of the 5th Infantry Division until his designation as Inspector General of the Armed Forces of the Philippines. He retired in 2016 after reaching the mandatory age of 56.[5]
- April 4 - Roderick Paulate, Filipino actor and politician
- April 5 - Von Flores, is a Filipino-Canadian actor.
- April 7 - Jose Elmer Mangalinao, is a Filipino bishop of the Catholic Church. He is the third and current Bishop of Bayombong since 2018.[2][3][4]
- April 19 - Reno Lim, Filipino politician. A member of the Lakas-Kampi-CMD (and formerly of the Nationalist People's Coalition), he was elected as a Member of the House of Representatives, representing the 3rd District of Albay beginning in 2007. He is married to Rosalinda and has two children with her, Ronwell and Rochelle. He ran for re-election but lost to ex-governor Fernando Gonzalez. He filed for his opponent's disqualification, and won the case, albeit Gonzalez appealed to the COMELEC.
- May 18 - Tom Byrd, is an American actor.
- May 21 - Vivian Velez, Filipino actress
- May 24 - Michael de Mesa, Filipino actor and director
- June 19 - Bing Davao, Veteran Filipino actor (d. 2025).
- June 21 - Louie Ocampo, Filipino composer and arranger
- July 10 - Lean Alejandro, was a student leader and left-wing nationalist political activist in the Philippines (d. 1987).
- July 30 - Brillante Mendoza, is a Filipino independent filmmaker.[3] Mendoza is known one of the key members associated with the Philippine New Wave.[4]
- August 16 - Emi Rubiano,is a Filipino businesswoman and politician currently serving as mayor of Pasay since 2019. She previously served as a member of the House of Representatives for the lone district of Pasay from 2010 until 2019, and city councilor from 1998 until 2004, and again from 2007 until 2010.
- September 15 - Kata Inocencio, Filipino broadcast journalist, child rights advocate, television producer and host in the Philippines
- September 16 - Irene Marcos, is the third child of the late former president Ferdinand Marcos and former first lady Imelda Marcos. Her brother Bongbong Marcos is the current president of the Philippines.
- September 20 - Nap Gutierrez, Veteran Sports Columinst (d. 2023)
- September 28 - Socrates Villegas, [1] is a Filipino prelate, and a professed member of the Dominican Order.[2] He is the fifth and current Archbishop of Lingayen-Dagupan in Pangasinan since 2009, and is the former president of the Catholic Bishops' Conference of the Philippines from 2013 to 2017,[3][4] previously serving as the vice president of the episcopal conference from 2011 to 2013.
- October 10 - Sonny Cabatu, is a Filipino retired professional basketball player in the Philippine Basketball Association and was the first draft pick of the league in 1985.[1] He is also the father of current Philippine Patriots player Junjun Cabatu.[2] He also played for the Cagayan de Oro Nuggets and Pasig-Rizal Pirates in the Metropolitan Basketball Association.
- November 11 - Paquito Ochoa Jr., Filipino lawyer, 37th Executive Secretary of President Benigno Aquino III and city administrator of Quezon City from 2001 to 2010.[1]
- November 12 - Jose Bantolo, Filipino Roman Catholic prelate (d. 2025)
- November 26 - Randy Santiago, Filipino actor, comedian, television host, musician, director, producer and entrepreneur
- December 4 - Dindo Arroyo, actor and sidekick
- December 11 - Renz Verano, Filipino actor singer
- December 15 - Benjamin Magalong, Filipino politician and retired police officer serving as the mayor of Baguio since 2019.
