= 1521 in the Philippines =

- Decades
- See also: List of years in the Philippines

1521 in the Philippines details events of note that happened in the Philippines in the year 1521.

== Events ==
=== March ===
- March 16 – Ferdinand Magellan reaches the Homonhon, Philippines.
- March 28 – Ferdinand Magellan and his men anchored off the island of Limasawa.
- March 31 – The first Catholic Mass was held in Limasawa.

=== April ===
- April 7 – Ferdinand Magellan arrives at Cebu.
- April 14 – Rajah Humabon and his queen Hara Humamay are christened Carlos and Juana respectively.
- April 27:
  - Battle of Mactan: Ferdinand Magellan is killed by Lapulapu in the Philippines.
  - Rajah Tupas succeeds Rajah Humabon as the Rajah of Cebu.

== See also ==
- List of years in the Philippines
- Timeline of Philippine History
