= 1916 in the Philippines =

- Decades: 1890s; 1900s; 1910s; 1920s; 1930s
- See also: List of years in the Philippines

1916 in the Philippines details events of note that happened in the Philippines in 1916

== Incumbents ==
=== U.S. Insular Government ===
- Governor General:
  - Francis Burton Harrison

== Events ==
=== August ===
- August 29 – Philippine Autonomy Act becomes law as a new Organic Act.^{[354]}

== Holidays ==
As a former colony of Spanish Empire and being a catholic country, the following were considered holidays:

- January 1 – New Year's Day
- April 4 – Maundy Thursday
- April 5 – Good Friday
- December 25 – Christmas Day
