= 2027 SEA Plus Youth Games =

International youth multi-sport event

1st SEA Plus Youth Games
- Host city: Manila, Pasig, Tagaytay and Subic, Philippines
- Nations: 28 (planned)
- Events: 23 sports (planned)
- Opening: 2 December 2027
- Closing: 14 December 2027

The 2027 Southeast Asian Plus Youth Games (2027 SEA Plus YG), branded as Philippines 2027, will be the inaugural edition of the SEA Plus Youth Games, a regional multi-sports youth tournament primarily for countries from Southeast Asia and guest nations from outside the region. It will be for athletes 16-years old and below.

The inaugural edition will be hosted in four main hubs in the Philippines namely Manila, Pasig, Tagaytay and Subic, Philippines from 2 to 14 December 2027.

== Background ==
=== Conception ===
Plans for a "SEA Games Plus" were first announced by the Indonesian Olympic Committee president, Raja Sapta Oktohari, on 25 December 2025. He pitched the proposal as an "expanded" SEA Games with the inclusion of countries of Oceania as well as Bhutan (which is where the "plus" in the event comes from). He argued that introducing this would support athletes in bridging the gap between regional and international events, focus on holding more Olympic sports over regional sports, and eliminating the possibility for host nations to tamper with the SEA Games charter to maximise medal hauls. Initially, the first edition was planned to be held in the Philippines in 2028.

In March 2026, the Philippines was confirmed to be the inaugural host with the first SEA Plus Youth Games. On 11 July 2026, the games were officially launched during the meeting of the executive council at the Solaire Resort in Parañaque. It was attended by delegates from the 11 ASEAN countries as well as other invitee nations. Ramon Suzara was also designated as CEO and President of the local organizing committee.

=== Eligibility ===
The 2027 SEA Plus Youth Games is restricted to athletes 16 years old and younger. At least for Filipino dual nationals, a Philippine passport would suffice.

== Development and preparations ==
=== Venues ===
The organising committee proposed holding sports in four clusters for across Manila, Pasig, Subic and Tagaytay.

City	Venue		Events	Capacity
Pasay	SMX Center for International Trade and Exhibitions		Arnis	TBA
Pasay	SMX Center for International Trade and Exhibitions		Billiards and snooker	TBA
Pasay	SMX Center for International Trade and Exhibitions		Dancesport	TBA
Pasay	SMX Center for International Trade and Exhibitions		Fencing	TBA
Pasay	SMX Center for International Trade and Exhibitions		Ju-jitsu	TBA
Pasay	SMX Center for International Trade and Exhibitions		Judo	TBA
Pasay	SMX Center for International Trade and Exhibitions		Karate	TBA
Pasay	SMX Center for International Trade and Exhibitions		Mixed martial arts	TBA
Pasay	SMX Center for International Trade and Exhibitions		Taekwondo	TBA
Pasay	SMX Center for International Trade and Exhibitions		Wrestling	TBA
Pasig	PhilSports Complex	Football and Athletics Stadium	Athletics	TBA
Pasig	PhilSports Complex	Arena	Basketball (3x3 and 5x5)	10,000
Pasig	PhilSports Complex	Swimming Center	Aquatics	TBA
Manila	Rizal Memorial Sports Complex	TBA	Boxing	TBA
Manila	Rizal Memorial Sports Complex	TBA	Gymnastics	TBA
Manila	Rizal Memorial Sports Complex	Tennis Center	Tennis	2,000 (all courts)
Tagaytay	Tagaytay Midlands Golf Club		Golf	—N/a
Tagaytay	Tagaytay City Skatepark		Skateboarding	TBA
Tagaytay	TBA		Speedcubing	TBA
Subic Bay	TBA		Triathlon	TBA

== The Games ==
=== Sports ===
The sports programme will consist of two compulsory sports, a maximum of twelve Olympic sports, a maximum of five non-Olympic sports, and one traditional sport with up to six medal events. Speedcubing has been proposed to be included. A total of 23 sports are tentatively planned to be held.

- Aquatics (disciplines to be confirmed)
- Arnis
- Athletics
- Basketball
  - 3x3 Basketball
  - 5x5 Basketball
- Billiards and snooker
- Boxing
- Dancesport (disciplines to be confirmed)
- Fencing
- Golf
- Gymnastics (disciplines to be confirmed)
- Judo
- Ju-jitsu
- Mixed martial arts
- Skateboarding
- Speedcubing
- Taekwondo
- Tennis
- Triathlon
- Wrestling

== Participating National Olympic Committees ==
All eleven National Olympic Committee (NOC) members of the Southeast Asian Games Federation (SEAGF) are eligible to enter the games. Additionally, invitations were extended to NOCs outside of Southeast Asia. As of July 2026, it is projected that 28 nations will compete in the games.

Participating National Olympic Committees (NOCs)
Southeast Asian Games Federation members
Brunei; Cambodia; Indonesia; Laos; Malaysia; Myanmar; Philippines (hosts); Singapore; Thailand; Timor-Leste; Vietnam
Guest NOCs	Other invited NOCs (to be confirmed)	
Guest NOCs	Present in July 11, 2026 launch	Others
Chinese Taipei; Macau; Maldives; Sri Lanka	Bahrain; Bhutan; Nepal; Qatar; Saudi Arabia	Australia; Japan; Kyrgyzstan; New Zealand; North Korea; Palestine; South Korea; Turkmenistan
