= Filipino First policy =

1958 Philippine economic policy

Filipino First (Tagalog: Pilipino Muna) refers to a protectionist to economic nationalist policy first introduced and implemented by the administration of then Philippine President Carlos P. Garcia. Under the policy, Filipino-owned business is prioritized over its foreign counterparts, and the patronizing of Filipino-made products by Filipinos was also promoted. Besides the policy, Garcia was still a supporter of capitalism.

== History ==
=== Under President Carlos P. Garcia ===
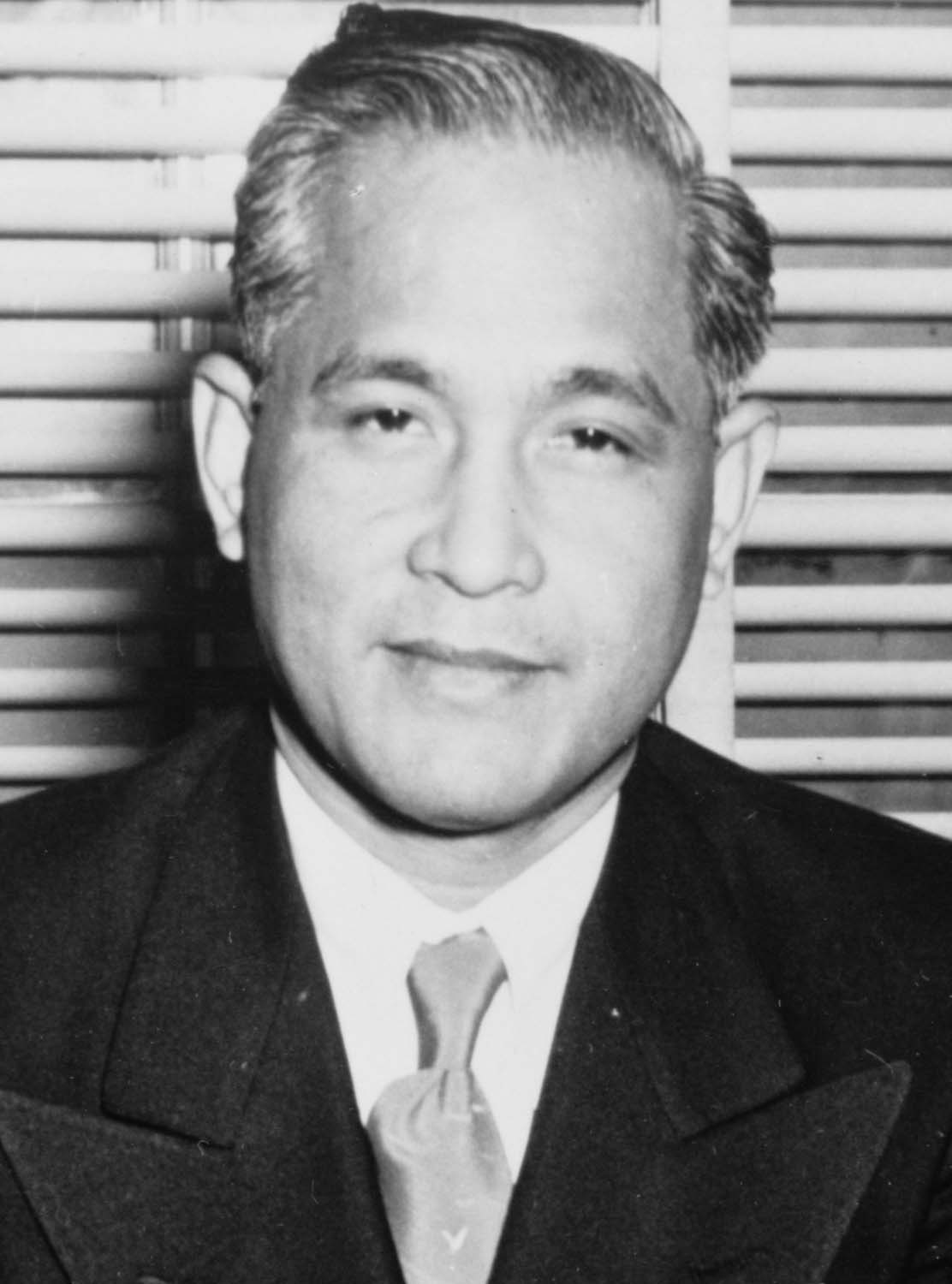
President Carlos P. Garcia introduced the Filipino First policy.

The policy of Garcia, was a response to the impact of free trade and American economic dominance in the Philippines for years following the World War II. It is meant to assert greater Filipino role over the country's economy if not to gain control of it by promoting "Filipino business establishment".

Garcia first instituted the policy with the issuance of Resolution No. 202 of the National Economic Council on August 28, 1958. The policy dictates that Filipinos would have preference over non-Filipinos in receiving foreign exchange. In line with the policy, Garcia pledged that his administration would assist Filipino entrepreneurs to make ventures in industries dominated by non-Filipinos.

The policy received positive reception from Filipino businessmen, and there were calls to expand the scope of the policy to include other spheres of society such as education.

However, it received negative reception from foreign and/or non-native businessmen, particularly the Americans, Chinese, along with their Chinese Filipino counterparts. Chinese Filipinos in particular accused the policy of discrimination over its interpretation of who is a "Filipino" and felt marginalized by the policy. The opposition branded the policy as a political propaganda meant to win support from the public to secure Garcia's reelection as President in the next elections. Critics has also labeled the policy as being "anti-foreign"

Garcia in response to his critics said that his policy was not meant to foster Filipino "exclusiveness" or was meant to be "anti-foreign" and stated that the Philippines will not close itself to foreign capital. He asserts that the policy is meant to give Filipinos priority in relation to the control over the country's basic industries and their development.

=== 1987 Constitution ===
The Filipino First policy may also refer to a set of provisions found in the 1987 Constitution of the Philippines which gives Filipinos preferential treatment in the national economy over foreigners.

...in the grant of rights, privileges, and concessions covering the national economy and patrimony, the State shall give preference to qualified Filipinos

— Article XII, 1987 Constitution of the Philippines
