= SEA Plus Youth Games =

Sport event

- Abbreviation: SEA Plus YG
- Purpose: Youth multi sport event primarily for nations on the Southeast Asian subcontinent
- Inaugurated: 2027 SEA Plus Youth Games in Manila, Philippines (planned)
- President: Abraham Tolentino

The Southeast Asian Plus Youth Games (SEA Plus YG) is a planned youth multi-sport event primarily involving participants from Southeast Asia.

== History ==
Plans for a "SEA Games Plus" were first announced by the Indonesian Olympic Committee president, Raja Sapta Oktohari, on 25 December 2025. He pitched the proposal as an "expanded" SEA Games with the inclusion of countries of Oceania as well as Bhutan (which is where the "plus" in the event comes from). He argued that introducing this would support athletes in bridging the gap between regional and international events, focus on holding more Olympic sports over regional sports, and eliminating the possibility for host nations to tamper with the SEA Games charter to maximise medal hauls. The first edition is planned to be held in the Philippines in 2027.

The plan was confirmed and clarified by the Philippine Olympic Committee president Abraham Tolentino on 1 January 2026. The tournament was clarified to be a multi-sport tournament for athletes 17 years old and below and will involve countries of Southeast Asia as well as one guest country from another Asian sub-region. It was reportedly established during meetings held during the 2025 SEA Games in Thailand, with Tolentino named as the inaugural president. Nine National Olympic Committee (NOCs) have reportedly committed to the SEA Plus Youth Games.

== Participating NOCs ==
The imprimatur from the presidents of the following National Olympic Committee (NOCs) have reportedly been secured.

National Olympic Committees from South East Asia
Nation	Code	National Olympic Committee	Created
Cambodia	CAM	National Olympic Committee of Cambodia	1983
Indonesia	INA	Indonesian Olympic Committee	1946
Laos	LAO	National Olympic Committee of Laos	1975
Malaysia	MAS	Olympic Council of Malaysia	1953
Myanmar	MYA	Myanmar Olympic Committee	1947
Philippines	PHI	Philippine Olympic Committee	1911
Thailand	THA	National Olympic Committee of Thailand	1948
Timor-Leste	TLS	National Olympic Committee of Timor Leste	2003
Vietnam	VIE	Vietnam Olympic Committee	1952

National Olympic Committees from outside of South East Asia
Nation	Code	National Olympic Committee	Created
Chinese Taipei	TPE	Chinese Taipei Olympic Committee	1910
Macau	MAC	Sports and Olympic Committee of Macau, China	1987
Maldives	MDV	Maldives Olympic Committee	1985
Sri Lanka	SRI	National Olympic Committee of Sri Lanka	1937

== Editions ==
List of SEA Plus Youth Games
No.	Year	Host country	Opened by	Date	Sports	Events	Na.	Com.	Top-ranked	Ref.
1	2027	Philippines	President Bongbong Marcos (expected)	2–14 December	Future event					

== Sports ==
The programme will consist of two compulsory sports, a maximum of twelve Olympic sports, a maximum of five non-Olympic sports, and one traditional sport with up to six medal events.
