= Benedicto Ducat =

Benedicto "Bong" Ducat
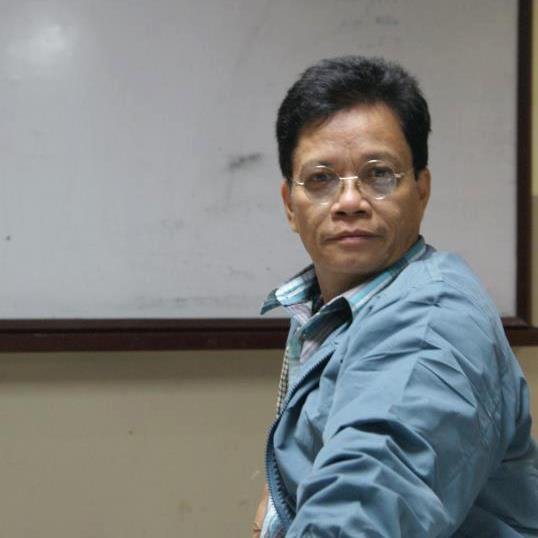
- Bong Ducat teaching in art class.
- Born: Benedicto Ducat; May 6, 1957 (age 67); Tondo, Manila
- Education: University of Santo Tomas College of Fine Arts
- Known for: Painter
- Notable work: The Joyful Moods of Nature; Forest; Leaves; Lotus

Benedicto “Bong” Ducat (born May 6, 1957) is a Filipino impressionist painter. He is now teaching at the University of Santo Tomas College of Fine Arts and Design. He is noted for his renderings of plants, flowers and nature in droplet-like brush strokes and bright colors. In college, Ducat won the University of Santo Tomas Benavides Civic Award.

== Early life ==
Benedicto Ducat was born in Tondo, Manila on May 6, 1957. Bong is the son of Emerenciana and Abraham. He attended Melchora Aquino Elementary School and Jose P. Laurel High School. During his school days, he participated in art contests. He won 1st prize in the Melchora Aquino Drawing contest in the year 1967. He finished his college education at the University of Santo Tomas College of Architecture and Fine Arts in Manila, with a degree in Painting. He earned a master's degree at University of the Philippines, Diliman.

== Career ==
In 1980-1981, Bong worked as an Instructor at the Technology University of the Philippines. The following year, he worked as a visualizer in Abqaiq, Saudi Arabia. Until 1987, he was a self-employed sculptor of the Holy Images/Statues. In 1987-1989, He was a Finishing Department Head in FILMUNDO Export Corporation, that makes Filipino handicrafts, houseware, gifts/novelty items and Christmas and holiday decor. In 1989-1990, He was a supervisor at LAHI Crafts, Inc. In 1990-1992, He was an Instructor at the Philippine Women's University. He now works as a professor at the University of Santo Tomas College of Fine Arts and Design.

== Recognition ==
- University of Santo Tomas Benavides Civic Award
- 1975-1976 Most Outstanding Student (high school)
- 1976 Best Commercial Artist (high school)
- 1967 Third Honor (elementary school)
- 1967 Certificate of Merit

== Competitions/Prizes ==
=== Elementary ===
- 1st Prize - (1967) Melchora Aquino Drawing Contest
- 1st Prize - (1970) On-the-spot Drawing Contest
- 3rd Prize - (1968) Drawing contest
- 3rd Prize - (1968) Poster-Making Contest

=== High school ===
- 1st Prize - (1973) Agro-Industrial Fair
- 1st Prize - (1973) JP Laurel High School Painting Contest
- 1st Prize - (1976) JP Laurel Day Painting Contest
- 1st Prize - (1976) JP Laurel Drawing Contest
- 2nd Prize - (1974) YMCA Hi-Y Poster Making Contest
- 3rd Prize - (1975) JP Laurel Day Watercolor Contest
- 3rd Honorable Mention - (1975) San Jose Trozo Parish, Manila Painting Contest

=== College ===
- Art Association of the Philippines Best Entry (Gold Medal) - (November 1980) Devt. Painting Contest
- 1st Prize - (1980) UP Venerable Knight On-the-Spot Painting Contest
- 1st Prize - (1979) Philtrade Exhibit National On-the-spot Painting Contest
- 2nd Prize - (1980) University of Santo Tomas Annual Exhibits Composition Painting Contest
- 3rd Prize - (1979) University of the East Annual Foundation Day On-the-spot Painting Competition
- 3rd Prize - (1976) UST Annual Exhibit's Freehand Drawing
- 1st Honorable Mention - (1979) National On-the-spot Painting Contest at Sto Nino, Malolos Bulacan

== Solo Exhibit ==
1994 - "The Joyful Moods of Nature" at the Gallery 3, Midtown Hotel

=== Group Exhibit ===
- (1980) - Philippine Convention Center
- (1980) - UST Main Building, "Jerusalem"
- (1980) - UST Annual Students' Exhibit
- (1979) - Philtrade Exhibit
- (1978) - Hiyas ng Bulacan
- (1977) - Hiyas ng Bulacan
- (1979) - UP Balagtas at Selya
- (1977) - YMCA Annual Exhibit
- (1990) - Balon ng Sining, Intramuros
- (1990) - Etnik Group Show
- (1990) - Kamasipi
- (1991) - SCUD sa Fine Arts- PWU
- (1991) - Steel and Canvas, Toyota Shaw Showroom
- (1991) - Artists Reflections, City Gallery
- (1992) - Manila Artists Group, Manuela
