= Raul Gonzalez (journalist) =

Raul S. Gonzalez (c. 1935 – May 15, 2013) was a Filipino journalist and columnist. Gonzalez served as the press secretary for President Diosdado Macapagal from 1961 to 1965.

== Academia ==
Gonzalez graduated from San Beda College. He began his career as a reporter for the now-defunct Manila Chronicle, becoming the recipient of a Fulbright Grant. He later served as the vice president of university relations for the University of the East.

== Career ==
He became vice president of public affairs for the Government Service Insurance System in 1986 in the wake of the People Power Revolution. He was appointed to the board of directors of the Philippine Amusement and Gaming Corp by both former President Corazon Aquino and current President Benigno Aquino III.

He worked as a columnist and op-ed writer for The Philippine Star, Evening Star, The Evening Paper and The Daily Tribune during his later career.

== Death ==
Gonzalez died from cancer on May 15, 2013, at the age of 78. He was survived by his wife, Jean, and four children - Richie, Giselle, Noel and Pierre.
