= Prisco Nilo =

Filipino meteorologist (born 1957)

Prisco Duarte Nilo (born 1957) is a Filipino meteorologist. He is the former administrator of the Philippine Atmospheric, Geophysical and Astronomical Services Administration (PAGASA).

Nilo joined the Philippine Atmospheric, Geophysical and Astronomical Services Administration (PAGASA) in March 1984 as a meteorologist. He was appointed as PAGASA director in November 2007 by President Gloria Macapagal Arroyo. On August 6, 2010, the weather forecaster was relieved of his post as administrator of PAGASA by President Benigno Aquino III. The former PAGASA chief had been criticized repeatedly for supposed errors in storm predictions by the agency. According to Aquino, Nilo was fired due to inaccurate predictions of typhoon, particularly during the rush of Typhoon Conson (Basyang). The new Agency executive was named by Secretary of Science and Technology Mario Montejo, who eventually appointed Graciano Yumul in the position. After such events, the meteorologist was reassigned to another office at the Department of Science and Technology (DOST) where PAGASA is one of the attached agencies.

== Biography ==
Nilo entered PAGASA in March 1984 as a meteorologist.

The metereologist was appointed as PAGASA director in November 2007 by former President Gloria Macapagal Arroyo.

=== Typhoon Conson ===
In July 2010, the Philippines were hit by Typhoon Conson (Basyang), the second tropical cyclone during the 2010 Pacific typhoon season to impact the nation.

Conson was poorly forecast by PAGASA. From July 12 to 13, Conson was forecast to hit Aurora and Isabela provinces. But, at 11 pm PST (1500 UTC) on July 13 PAGASA changed its forecast from hitting Aurora and Isabela provinces, to Quezon province, Metro Manila and southern Luzon provinces. However, residents living in those areas were not advised that the typhoon would hit their area and they also were not informed that public storm signal number 2 was raised. With this, severe damage ensued in the said areas. Later that same day, President Benigno Aquino III reprimanded PAGASA for failing to predict that Conson would pass over Manila.

As a result, Aquino criticized PAGASA for not warning the residents of Metro Manila about the strong tropical storm that struck the nation's capital. However, according to Dr. Nilo and PAGASA, the agency didn't have adequate equipment to "accurately" predict a movement of a storm and the weather forecasting instruments were too old and needed to be upgraded.
