= 2027 in Philippine music =

The following is a list of events and releases related to Philippine music that have happened or are expected to happen in 2027.

== Notable shows ==
=== Local artists ===
Date(s)	Headliner(s)	Venue	City	Event / Tour	Note(s)	Ref.
January 29	Carmelle Collado	New Frontier Theater	Quezon	Unleashed	—N/a	
January 30	Jay Durias	Newport Performing Arts Theater	Pasay	Jay Durias: Reimagined	—N/a	
February 6	KZ Tandingan	Araneta Coliseum	Quezon	Wildflower	—N/a	
TBA	Moira Dela Torre	SM Mall of Asia Arena	Pasay	Where It All Started	Postponed from October 4, 2026, for undisclosed reasons	

=== International artists ===
Date(s)	Headliner(s)	Venue	City	Event / Tour	Note(s)	Ref.
January 1–3	Various	SM Mall of Asia Arena	Pasay	Disney on Ice: Let's Dance!	—N/a	
January 9	Sienna Spiro	New Frontier Theater	Quezon	My House Tour	—N/a	
January 20–21	Westlife	SM Mall of Asia Arena	Pasay	The 25th Anniversary World Tour	—N/a	
January 28	Blue	New Frontier Theater	Quezon	Blue: 25th Anniversary Tour	—N/a	
January 29	Katseye	SM Mall of Asia Arena	Pasay	The Wildworld Tour	—N/a	
January 30–31	IU	Philippine Sports Stadium	Bocaue	2027 world tour	In October 2026, IU stated on Berriz that she will perform in Manila for two days as part of her 2027 tour.	
January 30	Blue	SM Lanang – SMX Convention Center	Davao	Blue: 25th Anniversary Tour	—N/a	
January 31	Blue	Waterfront Hotel & Casino	Cebu	Blue: 25th Anniversary Tour	—N/a	
February 7	Katseye	SM Seaside Arena	Cebu	The Wildworld Tour	—N/a	
February 7	Maroon 5	SM Mall of Asia Arena	Pasay	Maroon 5 Live	—N/a	
February 15	Kehlani	SM Mall of Asia Arena	Pasay	Kehlani World Tour	With Waseel as a special guest	
February 16	Tiffany Darwish, The Jets	The Theatre at Solaire	Parañaque	Tiffany and The Jets	—N/a	
February 16	Freya Skye	New Frontier Theater	Quezon	Stars Align Tour	—N/a	
February 20	Young K	New Frontier Theater	Quezon	Youngest Solo Tour	—N/a	
February 20	BigBang	SMDC Festival Grounds	Parañaque	XX: Cosmos World Tour	—N/a	
February 24	Hayley Williams	Araneta Coliseum	Quezon	"The Hayley Williams Show"	—N/a	
March 9–28	Various artists	The Theatre at Solaire	Parañaque	Chicago	—N/a	
March 13–14, 16	BTS	Philippine Sports Stadium	Bocaue	Arirang World Tour	—N/a	
March 18–20	The Script	SM Mall of Asia Arena	Pasay	Man in the Arena	—N/a	
March 29	Toto	SM Mall of Asia Arena	Pasay	Toto 50th Anniversary Tour	—N/a	
March 30	Toto	SM Seaside Arena	Cebu	Toto 50th Anniversary Tour	—N/a	
April 2	M2M	Araneta Coliseum	Quezon	M2M two	—N/a	
April 13	Beabadoobee	SM Mall of Asia Arena	Pasay	The Powerlines Tour	—N/a	
April 17	Sleeping with Sirens	New Frontier Theater	Quezon	An Ending In Itself Tour	—N/a	
May 15–16, 18	Bruno Mars	Philippine Arena	Bocaue	The Romantic Tour	With Anderson .Paak (as DJ Pee .Wee) as a special guest	
May 25	Disturbed	SM Mall of Asia Arena	Pasay	The Sickness 25th Anniversary Tour	—N/a	
June 5	Tori Kelly	Filinvest City Tent	Muntinlupa	God Must Really Love Me World Tour	Part of Karpos Live series.	
June 6	Tori Kelly	Mactan Expo	Lapu-Lapu	God Must Really Love Me World Tour	Part of Karpos Live series.	
TBA	Post Malone	Philippine Arena	Bocaue	Big Ass Stadium Tour Part 2	With Don Toliver as the opening act. Postponed from September 29, 2026, for undisclosed reasons.	

=== Music festivals ===
Date(s)	Event	Venue	City	Notable performers	Note(s)	Ref.
January 14	LaLaLa Fest	Philippine Arena	Bocaue	Bini; Olivia Dean; Lola Amour; SunKissed Lola; UDD	—N/a	
January 30	The Cozy Cove Fest	Camp John Hay	Baguio	Angela Ken; Dionela; Maki	Originally scheduled on February 27 at Nine Degrees North but schedule and venue were changed to accommodate larger audiences	
