= Benjamin Abadiano =

Filipino lexicographer (born 1963)

- Born: 11 February 1963 (age 63)
- Occupation: Lexicographer
- Awards: Ramon Magsaysay Award

Benjamin Abadiano (born February 11, 1963) is a Filipino lexicographer who has worked in the country's highlands with the Mangyan, Lumad, and other indigenous peoples. He did volunteer work for nine years in Paitan, Oriental Mindoro, and later in Mindanao. He was awarded the 2004 Ramon Magsaysay Award for Emergent Leadership.

== Early life ==
According to Devex, he learned commitment sleeping on a fishing boat. His grandfather brought him to fish in afternoons, but he always fell asleep when fishing. For 13 years, he lived with his grandparents. His first encounter with indigenous people was when he was in college, meeting the Manobo tribe in Bukidnon. According to the website, he was surprised by the simplicity of their lives. When he was 21, he decided to "offer his life" to indigenous groups. He visited multiple tribes, staying at the Mangyan community for nine years.

== Career ==
Missionary sisters compelled him to begin an education program. The program evolved into the Tugdaan Center for Human and Environmental Development. After, he pursued priesthood with the Jesuits. He founded the Pamulaan Center for Indigenous Peoples' Education in Davao City. He won the 2004 Ramon Magsaysay Award for Emerging Leadership. Abadiano compiled the first Tagalog-Mangyan dictionary. He is currently the President of the Assisi Development Foundation, Inc. He created Advocafe, a cafe where products were made by indigenous people.
