= List of Philippine films of the 2020s =

- List of Philippine films of 2020
- List of Philippine films of 2021
- List of Philippine films of 2022
- List of Philippine films of 2023
- List of Philippine films of 2024
- List of Philippine films of 2025
- List of Philippine films of 2026
