= Rizal Day =

Public holiday in the Philippines

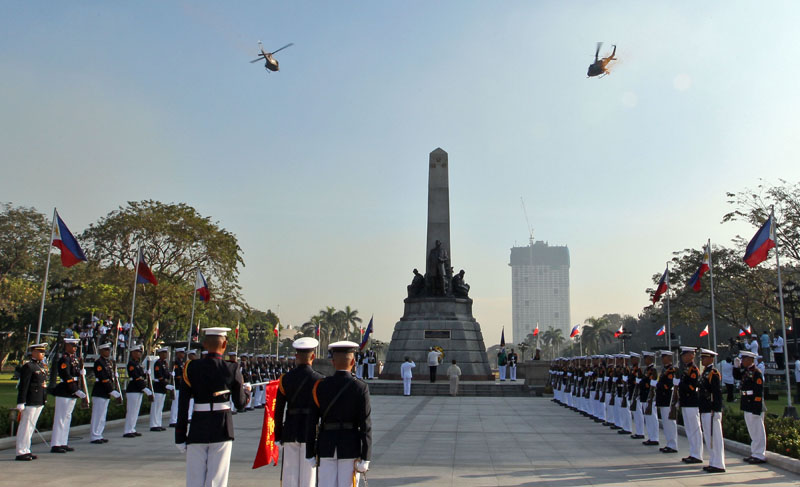
- President Benigno Aquino III offering a wreath at the Rizal Monument in Manila on Rizal Day 2015
- Observed by: Philippines
- Type: National
- Significance: Commemoration of the life and works of José Rizal
- Date: December 30
- Next time: December 30, 2026
- Frequency: Annual
- First time: December 30, 1898

Rizal Day (Spanish: Día de Rizal, Filipino: Araw ni Rizal; Tagalog: [riˈsal]) is a Philippine national holiday commemorating life and works of José Rizal, a national hero of the Philippines. It is celebrated every December 30, the anniversary of Rizal's 1896 execution at Bagumbayan (present-day Rizal Park) in Manila.

== History ==
Rizal Day was first instituted with a decree dated December 20, 1898, signed by President Emilio Aguinaldo in Malolos, Bulacan, celebrating December 30, 1898, as a national day of mourning for Rizal and all the victims of the Spanish colonial rule of the Philippines. Daet, Camarines Norte was the first town to follow the decree, building a monument designed by Lt. Col. Antonio Sanz, led by Sanz and Lt. Col. Ildefonso Alegre, and financed by the townsfolk of Camarines Norte and the rest of the Bicol Region. Finished in February 1899, the three-tiered stone pylon inscribing Rizal's novels Noli Me Tangere and El Filibusterismo, and Morga, for Antonio de Morga, author of Sucesos de las islas Filipinas, a book about the early days of the Spanish colonization in the Philippines.

With the victory of the Americans against the Spaniards in the Spanish–American War, the Americans took control of the Philippines. In an effort to demonstrate that they were more pro-Filipino than the Spaniards, the American Governor-General William Howard Taft in 1901 named Rizal a Philippine national hero. A year later, on February 1, 1902, the Philippine Commission enacted Act No. 345, which made December 30 a public holiday.

== Prohibited acts and activities during Rizal Day ==
Rizal Day Law

Congress of the Philippines
- Long title: An Act to prohibit cockfighting, horse racing, and jai-alai on the thirtieth day of December of each year and to create a committee to take charge of the proper celebration of Rizal Day in every municipality and chartered city, and for other purposes.
- Citation: Republic Act No. 229
- Territorial extent: Philippines
- Signed by: Elpidio Quirino
- Signed: June 9, 1948

Keywords
- Jose Rizal, gambling
- Status: In force

To underscore the solemnity of the event, President Elpidio Quirino signed Republic Act No. 229 into law on June 9, 1948, which prohibits cockfighting, horse racing and jai-alai every December 30. The law also requires that flags across the country remain at half staff throughout the day and that every city and municipality in the Philippines should hold a solemn commemoration in their respective areas.

Those contravening Republic Act No. 229 shall be liable to a fine not exceeding ₱200 or imprisonment not exceeding six months, or both, at the discretion of the court. If the offender holds the position of mayor in a municipality or city, an additional penalty of suspension from office for a duration of one month shall apply.

== Ceremonies ==
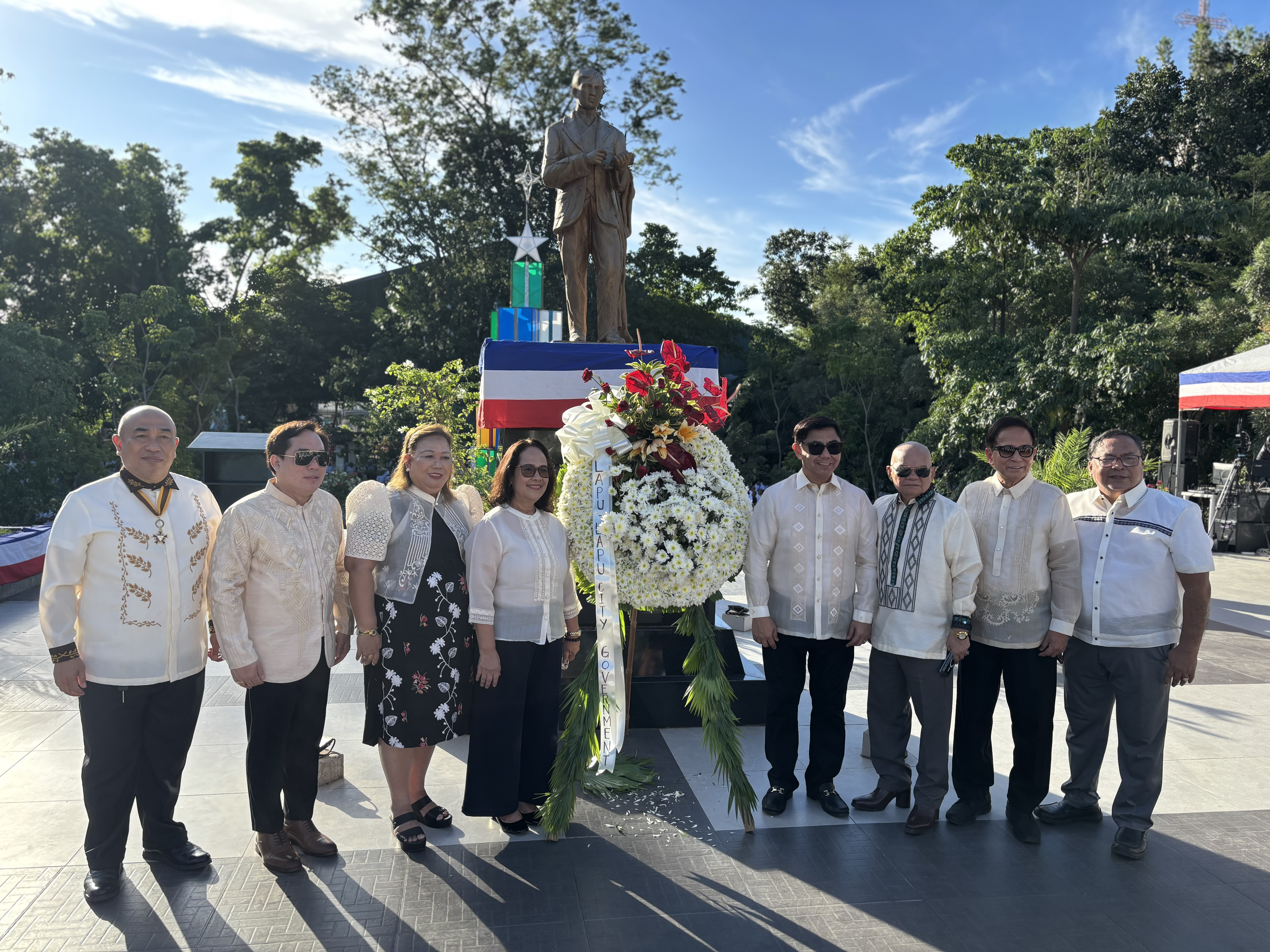
Rizal Day 2025 ceremony at Plaza Rizal, Lapu-Lapu City, Cebu

Rizal Day ceremonies are held at Rizal Park in Manila. This is usually held early in the morning, led by the president and vice president, and involves the raising of the national flag at Independence Flagpole, followed by a flypast by the Philippine Air Force and the laying of a wreath at the Rizal Monument. The president also usually has a year-end address that is first broadcast on this holiday.

Rites are also held elsewhere, with the chief executive of a province, city, or town presiding, and on Philippine consulates and embassies abroad. These rites are similar to the one in Manila, and most often include flag-raising, speeches, and wreath-laying ceremony at the locale's own monument to Rizal.

== Rizal Days in history ==
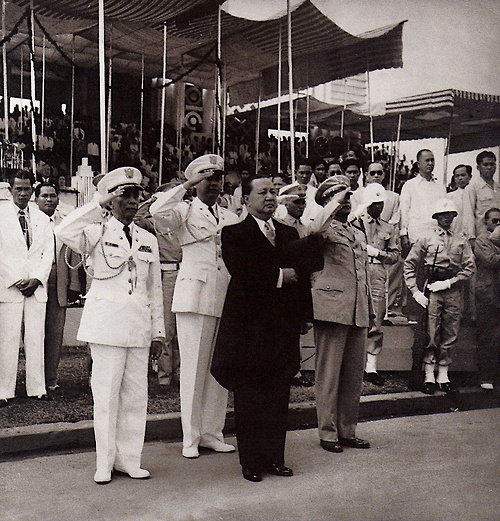
President Elpidio Quirino leads the 1949 Rizal Day ceremony.

On his Rizal Day address on December 30, 1937, President Manuel L. Quezon declared through Commonwealth Act No. 184 the adoption of Tagalog as the national language. Under Japanese occupation during World War II, the Rizal Day program of 1942 attended by Benigno Aquino Sr., and President Jose P. Laurel included the recital of Rizal's final poem Mi último adiós in Japanese and the inauguration of the KALIBAPI.

Rizal Day also doubled as the inauguration day of the incoming president, beginning in 1941 when President Quezon began his second term. Presidents usually chose Independence Grandstand (now known as Quirino Grandstand) as the inauguration venue because it faces the spot where Rizal was buried, and also the site of the independence ceremony in 1946, according to historian Manuel L. Quezon III. In the inauguration of Ramon Magsaysay after winning the 1953 presidential election via a landslide, around 300,000 to 500,000 people attended the ceremonies. With the approval of the 1973 constitution, inauguration days were moved to June 30.

On the centenary of Rizal's death on December 30, 1996, the program included retracing Rizal's last steps from his cell at Fort Santiago to the execution site, followed by a reenactment of his death and the customary flag-raising.

On December 30, 2000, local terrorists, with the backing of Jemaah Islamiyah, bombed five areas in Metro Manila, killing 22 and injuring 100.

== Changing the day of commemoration ==
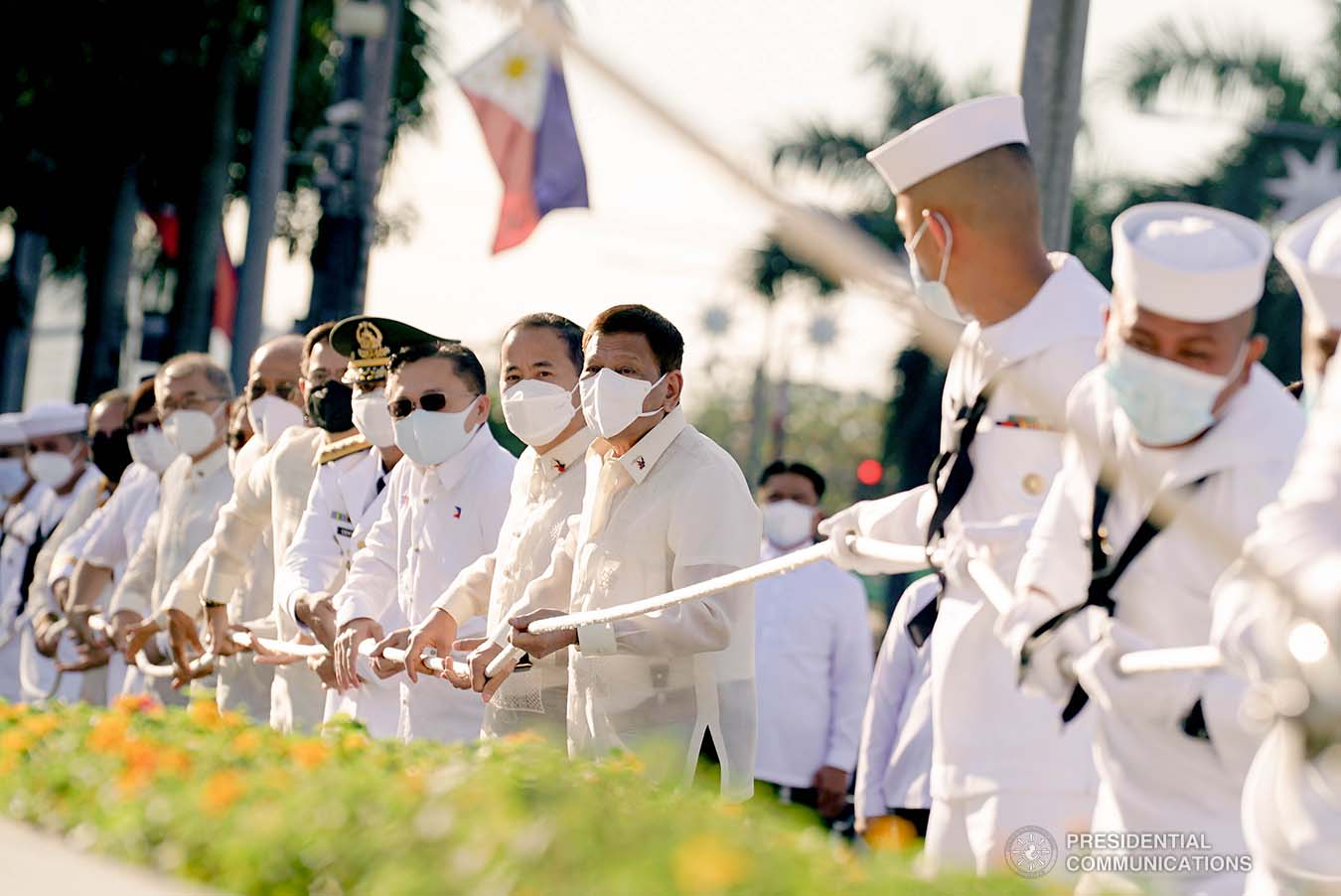
President Rodrigo Duterte (center) leads the flag-raising ceremony during the 125th martyrdom anniversary of Rizal at the Rizal Park in Manila on December 30, 2021.

Being that December 30 is sandwiched between Christmas and New Year's Day, National Historical Commission chairperson Ambeth Ocampo pushed for the moving of Rizal Day from December 30 to June 19, Rizal's birth. This would allow students to participate in commemoration activities as opposed to it being held on December 30 which is in the middle of the Christmas school break. The House of Representatives approved on its third reading a bill that would have changed it to June 19 on December 10, 2008, but subsequent holiday memos by the government kept the December 30 holiday, and did not institutionalize a holiday on June 19 except on certain years.

Additionally, Rizal's birth anniversaries in 1958, 1959, 1961 to 1965, and 2011 (observed on June 20) were declared as public holidays observed nationwide. June 19 is also annually marked as a special non-working holiday in his home province of Laguna.
