= 2020 in the Philippines =

- Decades: 2000s; 2010s; 2020s
- See also: List of years in the Philippines; films; music; television; sports

2020 in the Philippines details events of note that have occurred in the Philippines in 2020.

This year is largely defined by COVID-19 pandemic that caused of the national economic recession and continued until the state of public health emergency was lifted in the country on July 21, 2023.

== Incumbents ==
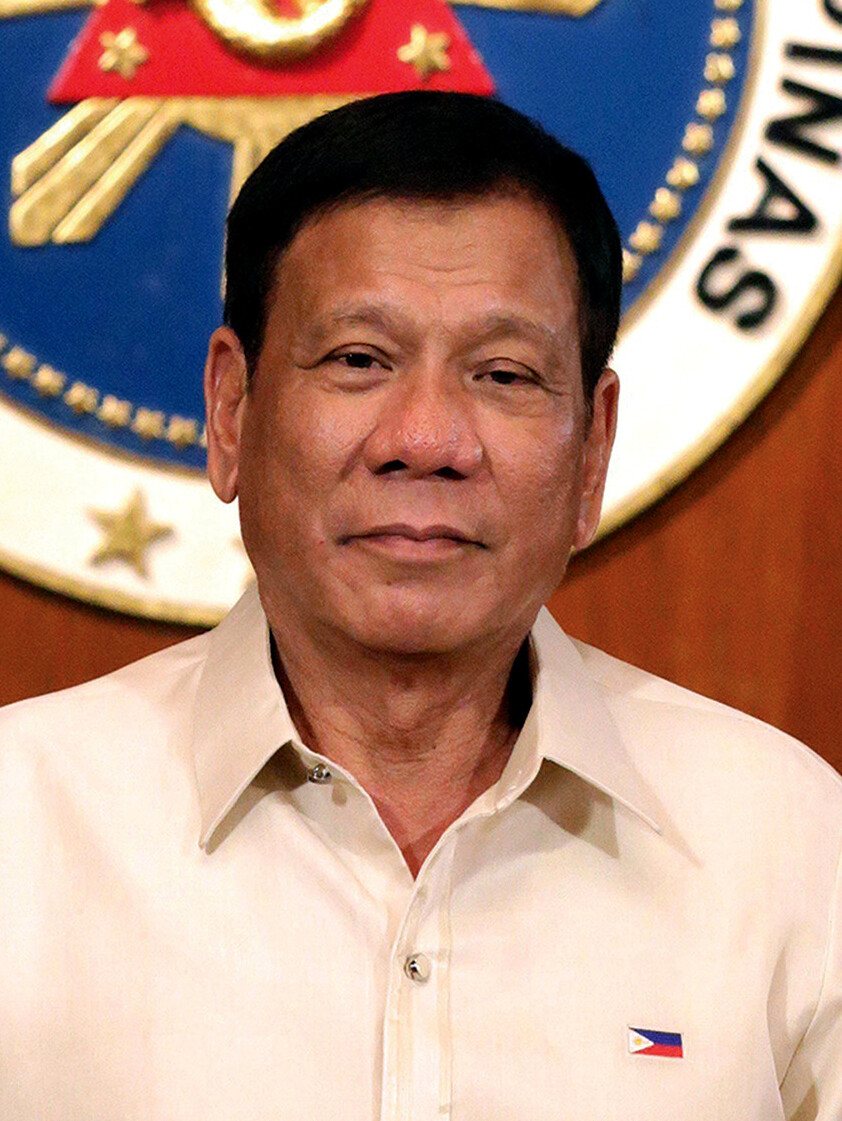
Rodrigo R.
Duterte

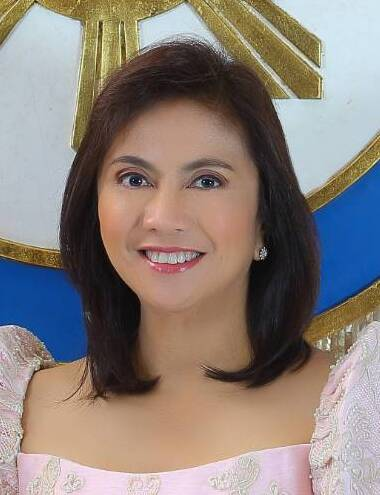
Leni G.
Robredo

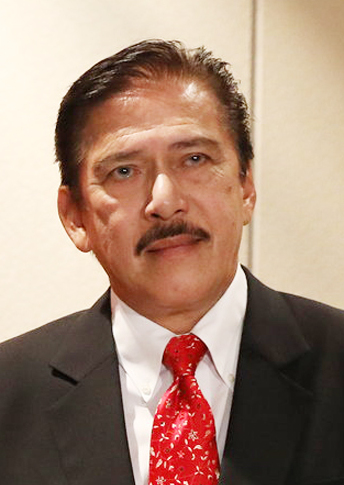
Vicente C.
Sotto III

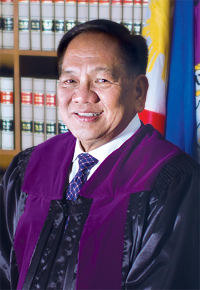
Diosdado M.
Peralta

- President: Rodrigo Duterte (PDP–Laban)
- Vice President: Leni Robredo (Liberal)
- Congress (18th):
  - Senate President: Tito Sotto (NPC)
  - House Speaker:
    - Alan Peter Cayetano (Nacionalista) (until October 13)
    - Lord Allan Velasco (PDP–Laban) (from October 13)
- Chief Justice: Diosdado Peralta

== Events ==
=== January ===
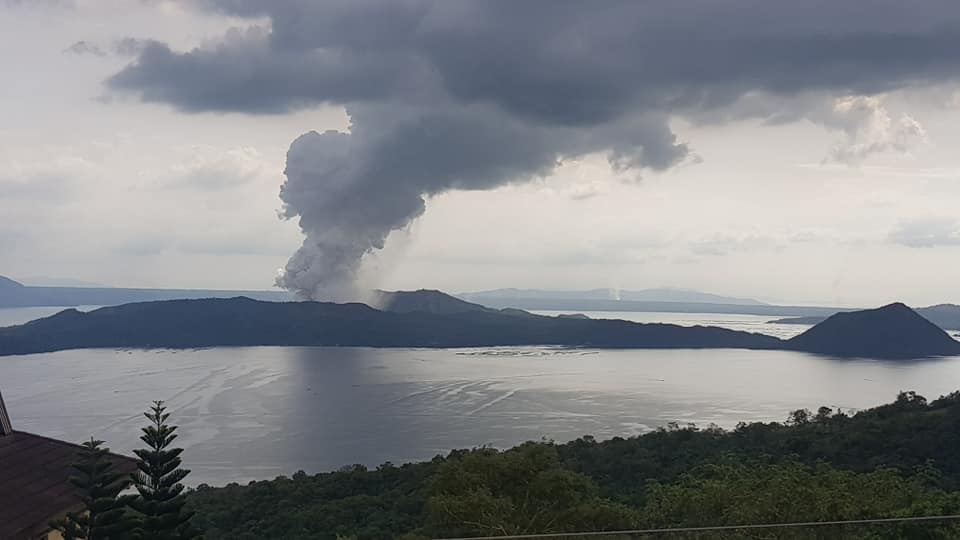
Taal Volcano

- January 7 – The Philippine Army ordered the relief of Lieutenant Colonel Napoleon Pabon, the commanding officer of the 2nd Infantry Battalion, in connection with the release of a "manipulated" photo of the surrendered of 300 New People's Army rebels in Masbate in December 2019.
- January 8 – President Rodrigo Duterte signed the Salary Standardization Law of 2019, increasing the salaries of over 1.4 million government employees starting this year.
- January 12 – Taal Volcano begins to erupt, prompting PHIVOLCS to raise the alert level to 4 until January 26. The eruption was the first major eruption of Taal since 1977. In response, President Duterte signed Proclamation No. 906 on February 21, declaring a state of calamity in the Calabarzon region for one year unless lifted.
- January 15 – The Philippine government imposed a total deployment ban to Kuwait after an NBI autopsy revealed the grim circumstances surrounding the death of Filipino worker Jeanelyn Villavende in the Gulf state in December 2019. On February 13, the ban was officially lifted, as the two governments reached an agreement for better working conditions of overseas Filipino workers.
- January 16 – The Department of Justice (DOJ) found probable cause to charge former Philippine National Police chief Police General Oscar Albayalde and a dozen police officers over an allegedly anomalous anti-drug operation in Pampanga in November 2013.
- January 20 – Three Bureau of Corrections (BuCor) officials Ramoncito Roque, Maribel Bancil, and Veronica Buño were ordered dismissed from service by the Ombudsman in connection with the questionable implementation of the Good Conduct Time Allowance (GCTA), a controversy that broke out in August 2019.
- January 21 – The Sandiganbayan acquitted former Philippine National Police (PNP) chief Alan Purisima and ex-PNP Special Action Force chief Getulio Napeñas of graft and usurpation charges for their involvement in the antiterrorist operation that led to the deaths of 44 SAF commandos in Mamasapano, Maguindanao on January 25, 2015.
- January 22 – President Duterte signs Republic Act No. 11467, which hikes the excise taxes on alcohol and imposes new duties on heated tobacco and vapor products effective January 1, 2020.
- January 30:
  - The Nueva Ecija Regional Trial Court (RTC) Branch 88 found Ma. Cristina Sergio and Julius Lacanilao, the recruiters of overseas Filipino worker Mary Jane Veloso guilty of illegal recruitment in a separate case filled by Lorna Valino, Ana Marie Gonzales, and Jenalyn Paraiso.
  - First case of coronavirus disease 2019 is confirmed by the DOH.
- January 31 – The Sandiganbayan found former MRT General Manager Al Vitangcol III and PH Trams incorporator Arturo Soriano, guilty of graft and violation of Procurement Law, for awarding MRT3's maintenance contract to an unqualified joint venture, PH Trams and CB&T, in 2012.

=== February ===
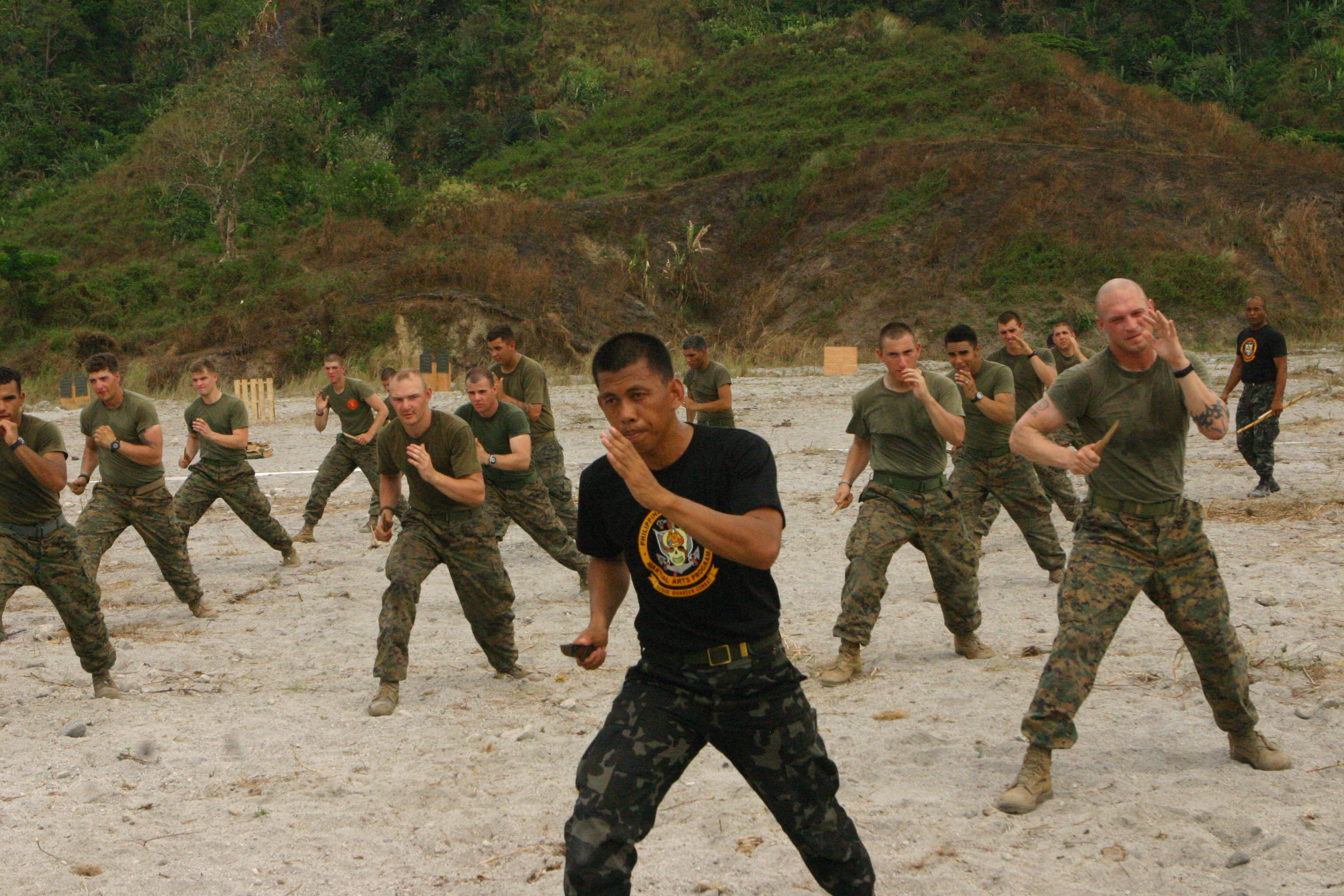
U.S. Marines participated in a martial arts class taught by Philippine Marine Corps instructors

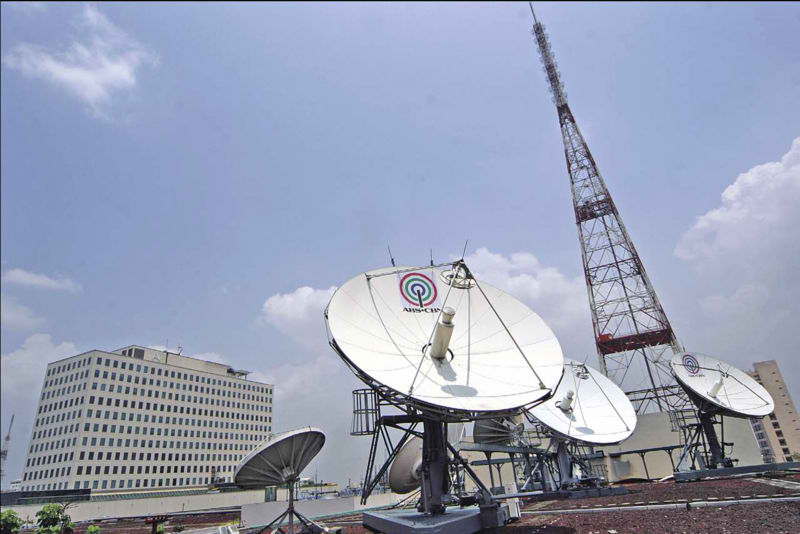
The ABS-CBN Broadcasting Center in Diliman, Quezon City, the headquarters of ABS-CBN

- February 3 – A state of calamity is declared by the provincial government of Davao Occidental, due to the African Swine Fever outbreak, a first for the Davao Region.
- February 5 – The Senate Blue Ribbon Committee recommended the filing of criminal charges against individuals involved in the Good Conduct Time Allowance controversy, including the near-release of former Calauan, Laguna, mayor Antonio Sanchez, the mastermind in the June 1993 rape and murder of UPLB students Eileen Sarmenta and Allan Gomez. On February 12, the Senate adopts the said recommendation.
- February 8 – A group of archaeologists led by the National Quincentennial Committee, unearthed the grave of Filipino World War II guerilla and scientist Maria Orosa at the Malate Catholic School compound in Manila, nearly 75 years since her death on February 13, 1945.
- February 10 – The DOJ cleared Vice President Leni Robredo and several opposition figures of sedition but indicted former Senator Antonio Trillanes IV and 10 others for "conspiracy to commit sedition" over an alleged ouster plot against President Duterte. On February 14, a Quezon City court issued an arrest warrant against Trillanes and nine others and four days later, Trillanes posted a bail for the case.
- February 11 – The Philippines announced that it will terminate the Visiting Forces Agreement with the U.S. The announcement is rescinded on June 1.
- February 15 – President Duterte leads the inauguration of the commercial operations at Sangley Airport in Cavite, 8 months after he ordered the start of its general aviation operations.
- February 17:
  - President Duterte signs Executive Order No. 104, or the Improving Access to Healthcare Through the Regulation of Prices in the Retail of Drugs and Medicines, that imposing a limit on the prices of several medicines and drugs.
  - Senator Risa Hontiveros revealed the alleged "pastillas" modus operandi within the BI that allows the entry of Chinese nationals to the country in exchange for ₱10,000 each. On February 20, President Duterte relieved all Immigration officials and employees involved in the said bribery scheme that allegedly gives VIP treatment to Chinese visitors. On September 2, the NBI filed a complaint against 19 BI personnel in connection with the said scheme. On September 22, Joshua Paul Capiral, a NBI official was arrested in an entrapment operation for allegedly accepting bribes from Bureau of Immigration personnel involved in the said scheme. On September 28, DOJ filed extortion and graft charges against NBI legal assistance chief Joshua Paul Capiral and his brother Christopher John, an immigration officer, before the Manila Regional Trial Court for allegedly accepting bribes from Bureau of Immigration personnel involved in the said scheme.
- February 18 – Former Communist Party of the Philippines (CPP) chairman and New People's Army (NPA) commander Rodolfo Salas was arrested in Angeles City.
- February 19 – Former official of BuCor Fredric Anthony Santos was shot dead in Muntinlupa.
- February 21:
  - The NBI filed a complaint for murder against Philippine Charity Sweepstakes Office board member Sandra Cam and six others over the killing of Charlie Yuson III on October 9, 2019.
  - The BIR shut down the operations of SAFYI, the first Philippine Offshore Gaming Operator (POGO) to be given a license by the government, after it failed to pay the 5% franchise tax.
  - President Duterte signs Executive Order No. 106, that prohibits vaping in public and prohibited the sale and manufacture of unregistered e-cigarettes due to their potential health risks.
- February 24 – The Senate public services committee begins its hearing on the issues surrounding the franchise renewal of ABS-CBN Broadcasting Corporation. On February 26, President Duterte accepted the apology of ABS-CBN over his unaired campaign ads during the 2016 presidential election.
- February 27 – The Philippine government lifted the suspension on negotiations and signing of loan and grant agreements with countries that sponsored and voted in favor of a United Nations investigation on the country's human rights situation.
- February 28 – The Sandiganbayan acquitted former PNP chief Alan Purisima of eight counts of perjury over his alleged failure to declare his wealth in full for 6 years.

=== March ===
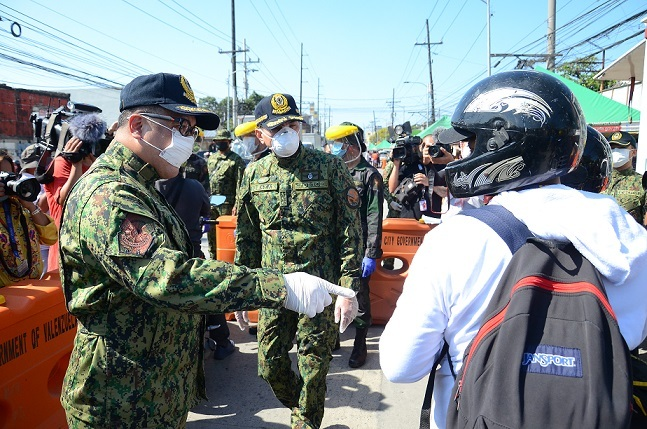
Police checkpoint near the border of Valenzuela, Metro Manila with Meycauayan, Bulacan

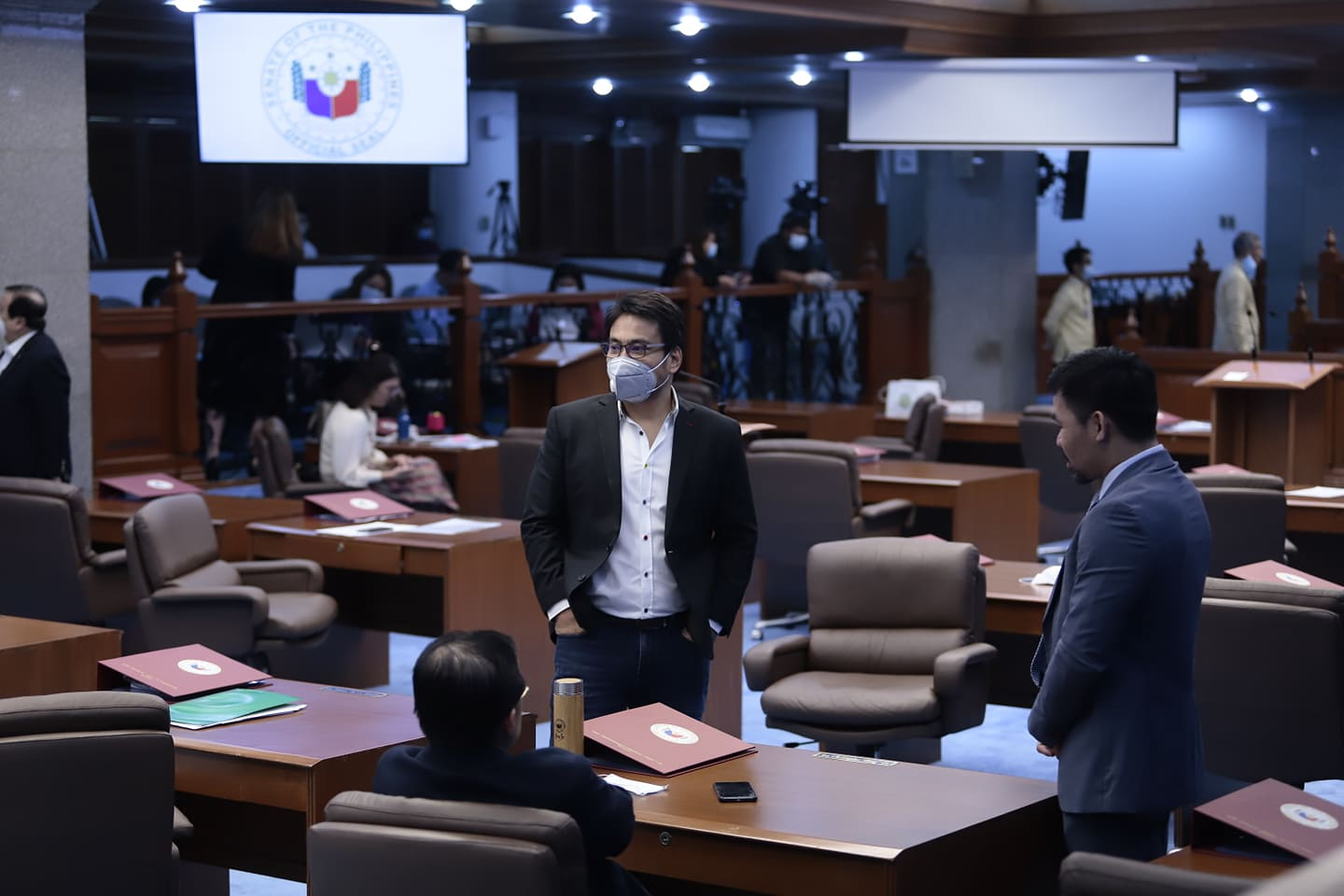
Senators during a special session to tackle the passage of the Bayanihan to Heal as One Act on March 23, 2020

- March 2
  - Former security guard Archie Paray takes more than 60 people hostage at the Greenhills shopping mall complex in San Juan City, Metro Manila.
  - The Bureau of Customs (BOC) confirms that suspected syndicates brought in an estimated $370 million into the Philippines in December 2019, with the help of Armed Forces of the Philippines (AFP), Philippine National Police (PNP) and airport police escorts.
- March 3 – Ombudsman Samuel Martires filed graft and indirect bribery charges against former Nayong Pilipino Foundation, Inc. (NPFI) chairman of the board Patricia Ocampo-Desiongco and five other ex-NPFI officials for accepting free transportation to and accommodation in Jeju Island, South Korea from a private firm during negotiations on a lease contract involving the same firm.
- March 9 – President Duterte signs Proclamation No. 922, that declared a public health emergency over the country due to the increasing number of coronavirus disease 2019 (COVID-19) cases in the country.
- March 12 – Code Red Sublevel 2 was declared in response to the COVID-19 pandemic and a partial lockdown was issued on Metro Manila to prevent a nationwide spread of the said disease.
- March 16:
  - The Department of Agriculture (DA) confirmed reports that bird flu or the H5N6 avian flu was detected in Jaen, Nueva Ecija.
  - President Duterte signs Proclamation No. 929, placing the entire Philippines under a state of calamity amid the ongoing situation of COVID-19. On September 16, President Duterte signs Proclamation No. 1021, that extends until September 12, 2021, the state of calamity in the country due to the COVID-19 pandemic.
  - The National Telecommunications Commission (NTC) issued Memorandum Order March 1, 2020, that all broadcast and communications companies would have the authority to stay on air with their permits automatically renewed while the entire Luzon is placed under enhanced community quarantine due to the COVID-19 pandemic.
- March 17 – Luzon was placed under an enhanced community quarantine due to the COVID-19 pandemic in the country as announced by the President in his evening address last March 16, 2020. This expanded the community quarantine imposed in Metro Manila on March 15. Quarantine measures in other parts of the country of varying levels were imposed as well in the following months.
- March 25 – President Duterte signs the Bayanihan to Heal as One Act of 2020 (Republic Act No. 11469), a measure that gives him additional powers to strengthen government's response to the coronavirus disease 2019 (COVID-19) pandemic after Congress urgently deliberated and passed the measure within a day. On July 1, the Supreme Court (SC) dismissed the petition filed by Jaime Ibañez questioning the constitutionality of the Bayanihan to Heal as One Act.

=== April ===
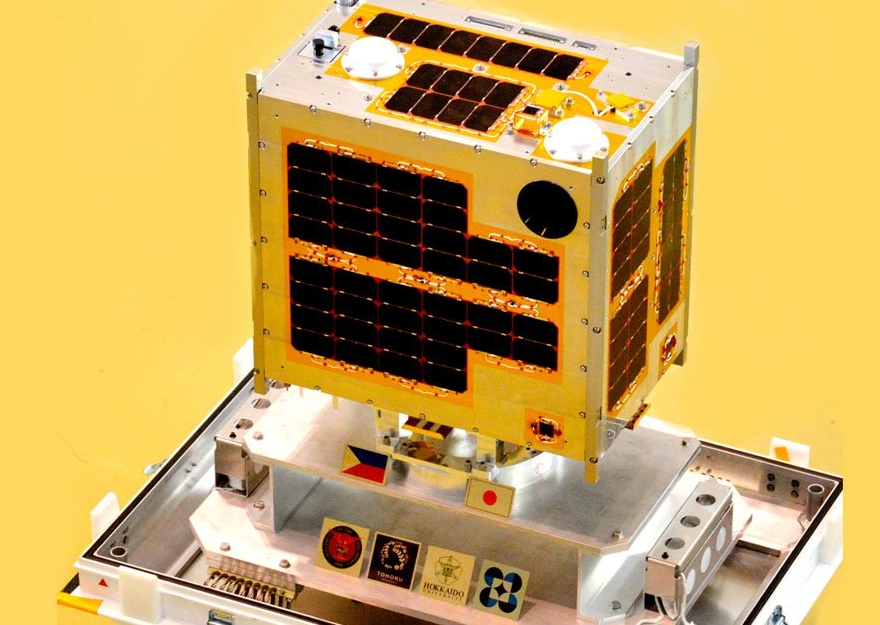
Diwata-1, Philippines' first micro-satellite

- April 6 – Diwata-1, the Philippines' first micro-satellite for scientific earth observation built by Filipino scientists, was officially decommissioned after re-entering the Earth's atmosphere.
- April 14 – The government began its mass testing processes on persons suspected of having COVID-19.
- April 17 – The Supreme Court conducted a special en banc session, the first-ever done online in its 119-year history as the judiciary seeks to deal with urgent matters amid a Luzon-wide lockdown imposed to stop the spread of the coronavirus disease 2019 (COVID-19).
- April 24 – The Chinese Embassy in the Philippines received criticism after releasing a music video about the relations of China and the Philippines during the COVID-19 pandemic.
- April 27:
  - 15 senators, files a resolution that seeks to amend the Senate rules to allow the conduct of plenary sessions and committee hearings via teleconference amid the coronavirus disease 2019 (COVID-19) situation.
  - President Duterte signs Executive Order No. 111, which abolished the Presidential Communications Development and Strategic Planning Office (PCDSPO), which served as his chief message-crafting body.
- April 28 – Taiwan rejected the Philippine Department of Labor and Employment's (DOLE) moves to deport Elanel Egot Ordidor, an overseas Filipino worker over social media posts critical of President Duterte, saying the Philippines must first consult with Taiwan before taking any drastic action.

=== May ===
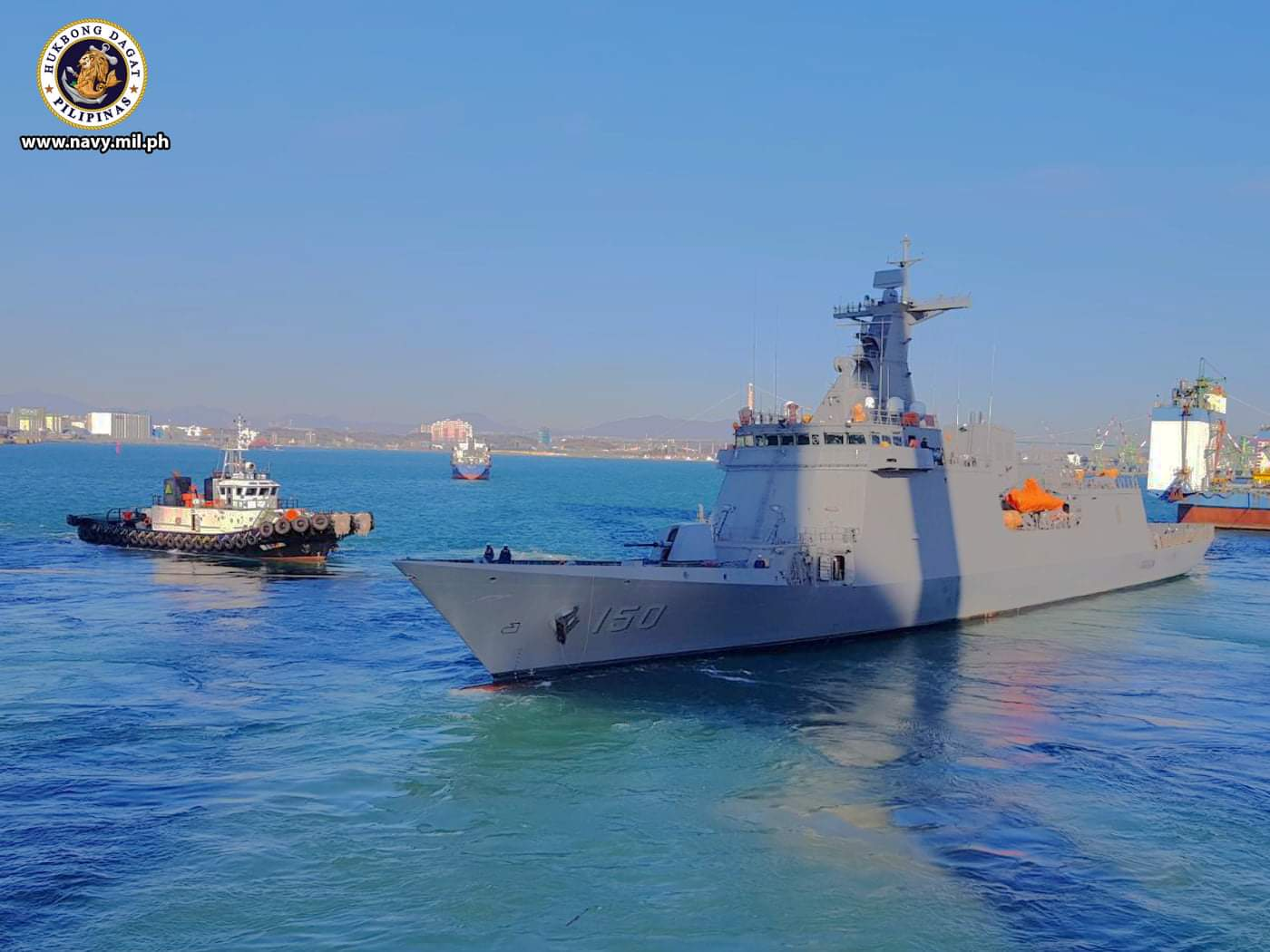
BRP Jose Rizal, the country's first missile-capable warship

- May 1 – Pope Francis names former Manila Archbishop Cardinal Luis Antonio Tagle to the rank of Cardinal-Bishop, the highest title of a Cardinal in the Catholic Church.
- May 4:
  - The radio and television franchise for ABS-CBN expired. Renewal of the franchise was uncertain due to tense relations of the network with the Duterte administration. On May 5, ABS-CBN's broadcasting operations were signed off the air at 7:52 p.m. due to the cease and desist order of the NTC to stop broadcast operations of the said network because of the expiration of its franchise granted to them on March 30, 1995. On June 23, the Supreme Court dismissed Solicitor General Jose Calida's petition questioning ABS-CBN Corporation's franchise, ruling that the issue was "moot and academic". On August 25, the Supreme Court dismissed ABS-CBN's petition challenging the National Telecommunications Commission's cease and desist order that forced it to shut down broadcast operations. On September 10, NTC recalled the frequencies assigned to ABS-CBN, which it said was warranted in the absence of a legislative franchise.
  - President Duterte directed the Philippine Health Insurance Corporation (PhilHealth) to make the payment of premiums voluntary for overseas Filipino workers in light of opposition against premium rate increases.
- May 6 – President Duterte signs Executive Order No. 114, that ordered the implementation of the "Balik Probinsya, Bagong Pag-asa" Program to decongest Metro Manila and promote countryside development.
- May 8 – The Supreme Court dismissed the petition filed by attorney Dino de Leon seeking the disclosure of President Duterte's health records. On September 8, SC denies with finality de Leon's bid to compel President Duterte to disclose his health records.
- May 11 – A plebiscite is set for the ratification of the law which approved the division of the provinces of Palawan into three provinces but rescheduled on March 13, 2021.
- May 13 – The NBI launched a probe into Overseas Workers Welfare Administration (OWWA) deputy administrator Mocha Uson over a coronavirus-related fake news.
- May 14 – Typhoon Vongfong (Ambo) makes landfall over Eastern Samar and hits Visayas, resulting to over a billion peso in damages.
- May 23 – BRP Jose Rizal, the country's first missile-capable warship, arrived in Subic, Zambales, after a 5-day maiden journey from South Korea.
- May 24 – Renato Llenes, awaiting trial for the killing of Christine Silawan reportedly kills himself while in police custody.

=== June ===
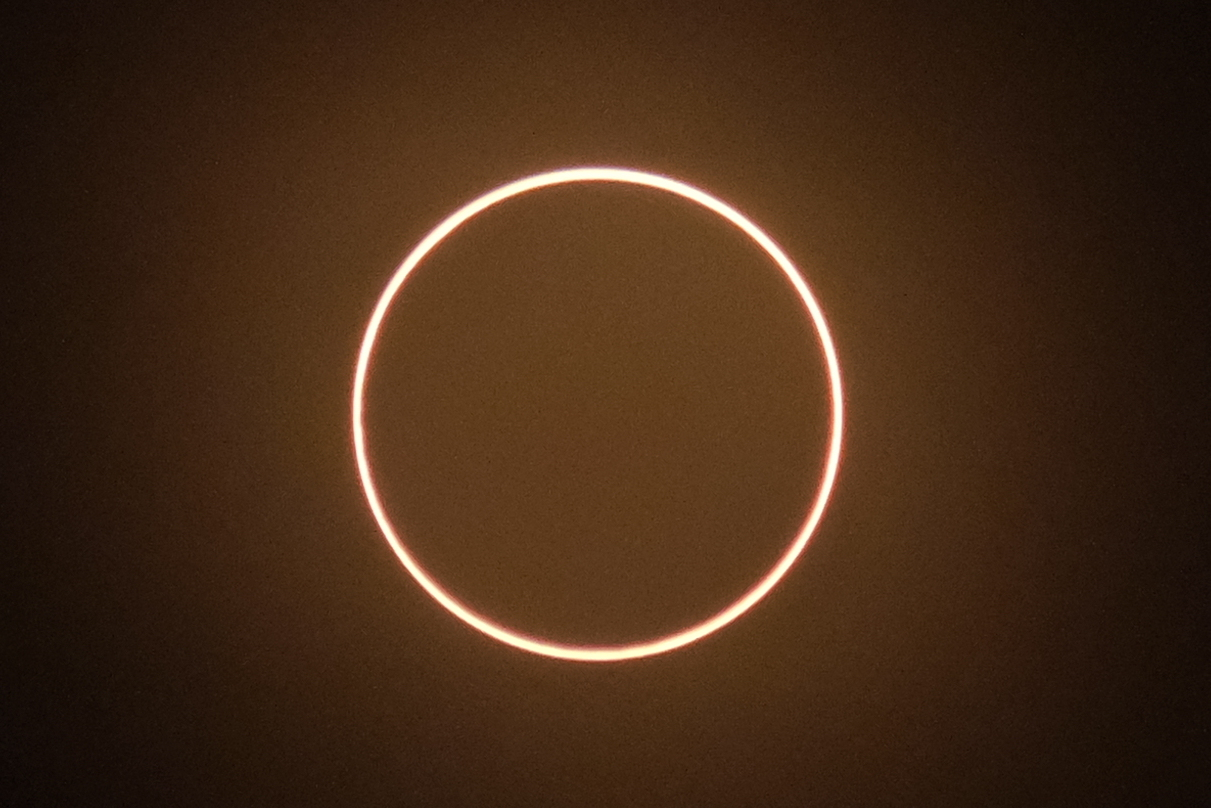
Solar eclipse of June 21, 2020

- June 3 – The Senate Electoral Tribunal denied the petition filed by Reymar Mansilungan and Efren Adan that seeking to declare Senator Aquilino "Koko" Pimentel III ineligible for the senatorial term 2019–2025.
- June 4 – The United Nations Office of the High Commissioner for Human Rights (UN-OHCHR) released its comprehensive report on the widespread killings in the Philippines under President Duterte.
- June 5 – Former Presidential Commission on Good Government (PCGG) chairman Camilo Sabio was arrested by the NBI in his home in Quezon City over the execution of judgment in one of the criminal cases against him pending before the Sandiganbayan.
- June 15 – The Manila Regional Trial Court Branch 46 convicts Rappler CEO Maria Ressa and former researcher-writer Reynaldo Santos Jr., of cyber libel over a 2012 article that linked a businessman to alleged illegal activities. On July 25, the Manila Regional Trial Court Branch 46 denied a motion for reconsideration filed by Ressa and Santos, Jr..
- June 19 – President Duterte signs Republic Act No. 11475, that officially transferring the capital and seat of government of Rizal province to Antipolo from Pasig.
- June 21 – An annular solar eclipse was witnessed by many astronomers and skywatchers throughout the country.
- June 25 – President Duterte signs Republic Act No. 11476, that mandating the inclusion of Good Manners and Right Conduct (GMRC) classes in the K-12 program.
- June 29 – Four soldiers were killed following a shooting incident with policemen in Barangay Walled City, Jolo, Sulu. On July 21, the NBI filed criminal complaints against members of the local police in Sulu allegedly involved in the shooting. On September 7, the PNP-Internal Affairs Service filed administrative and criminal complaints against the police officers involved in the shooting.

=== July ===
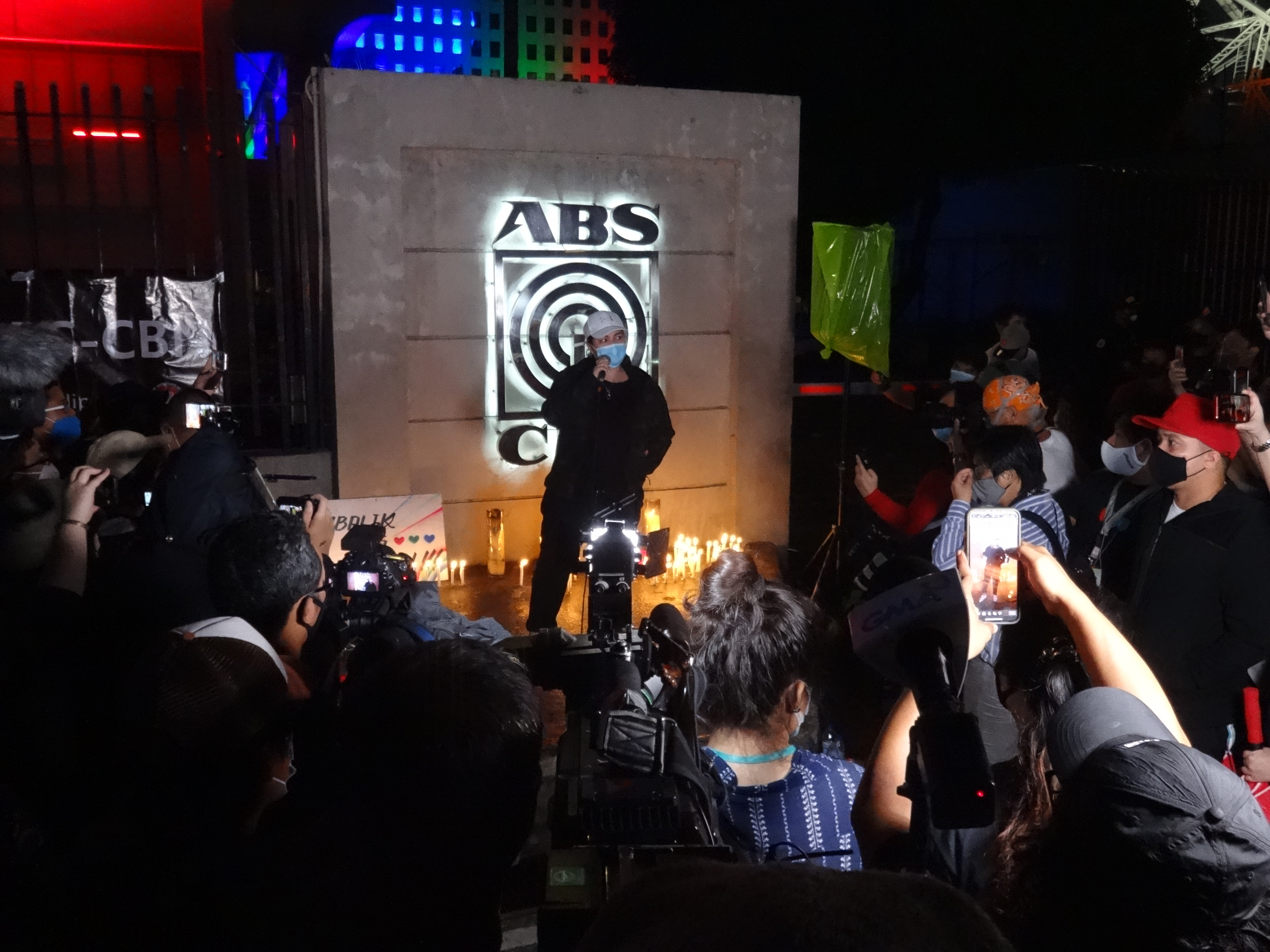
Supporters conducting a nightly noise barrage in front of the ABS-CBN headquarters, with ABS-CBN artist Angel Locsin speaking in front on July 10, 2020

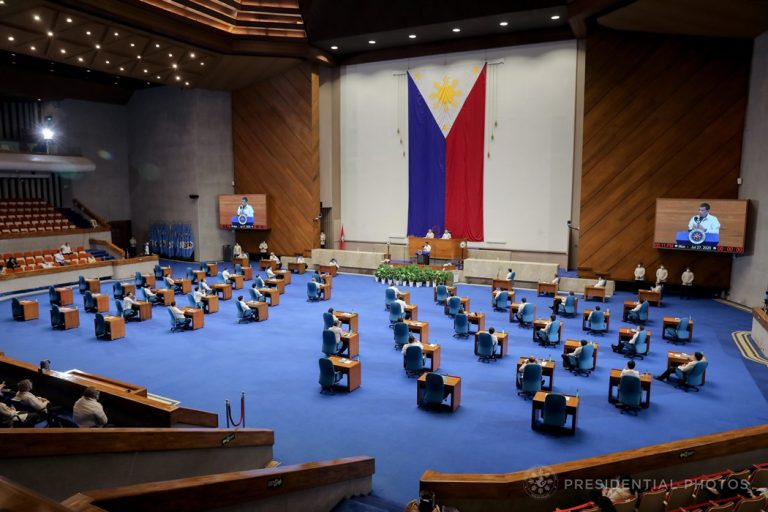
The session hall had limited physical attendance due to social distancing measures observed in response to the ongoing COVID-19 pandemic

- July 3 – President Duterte signs the Anti-Terrorism Act of 2020 (Republic Act No. 11479), a measure that giving the government more powers to act against persons or groups falling under what critics say is a dangerous and vague definition of terrorism.
- July 8 – Pope Francis names former Manila Archbishop Cardinal Luis Antonio Tagle as a member of the Pontifical Council for Inter-religious Dialogue, the Catholic Church's central office on the promotion of understanding among religions.
- July 10 – After 12 hearings which started last May 26, the House of Representatives, particularly on the Committee on Legislative Franchises, voted 70–11 to deny the franchise application of ABS-CBN.
- July 17 – President Duterte signs Republic Act No. 11480, which allows the president to move or reschedule the start of the school year in an event of a state of emergency or state of calamity.
- July 21 – Joel Apolinario, the founder of the Kapa Community Ministry International and 23 others were arrested in Surigao del Sur.
- July 23 – Four soldiers died and another was injured after a Philippine Air Force (PAF) helicopter crashed while taking off at the Cauayan Air Station in Isabela.
- July 27 – Dr. Roland Cortez, the chief of the National Center for Mental Health (NCMH), who was criticized over its handling of COVID-19 cases in the said facility in April 2020, was shot dead in Quezon City. On August 25, the Quezon City Police District (QCPD) filed murder complaints against seven suspects who were allegedly involved in the killing.
- July 29 – The Department of Agriculture through the Bureau of Animal Industry (DA-BAI) confirmed the detection of the avian influenza A(H5N6) virus in an egg-producing farm in San Luis, Pampanga.
- July 30:
  - After 9 years of hiding, former Dinagat Islands congressman Ruben Ecleo Jr., who was accused in the case of murder of Alona Bacolod-Ecleo in 2002 and anomalous 3 construction projects which undertaken between 1991 and 1994, during his term as mayor of San Jose, Dinagat Islands, was arrested in San Fernando, Pampanga.
  - Wesley Barayuga, the board secretary of the Philippine Charity Sweepstakes Office (PCSO), was shot dead in Mandaluyong.

=== August ===
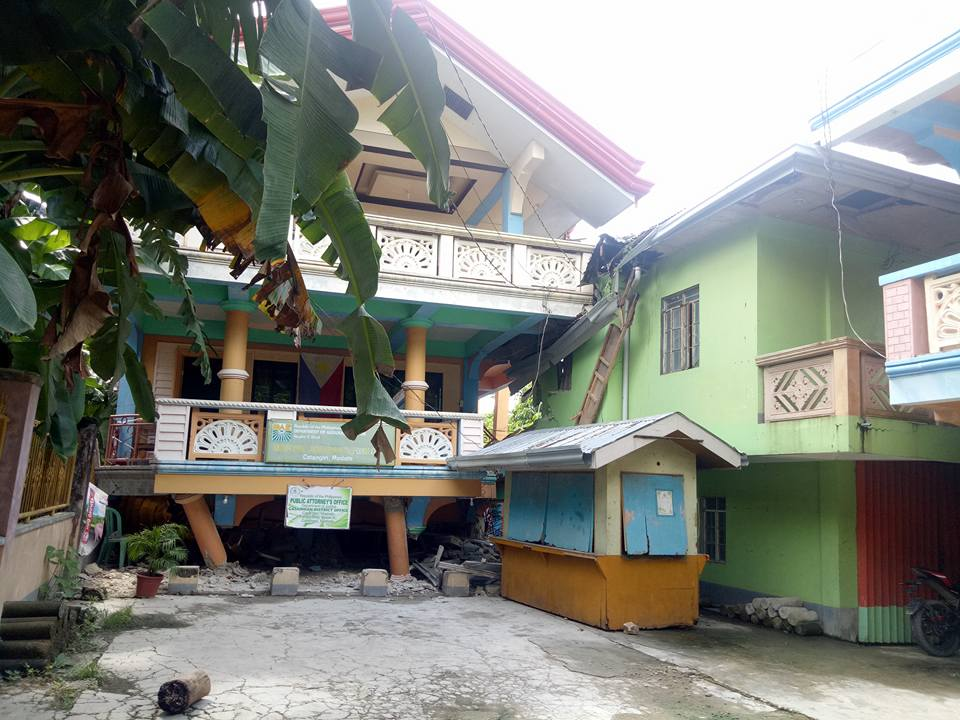
Partially collapsed building housing the Public Attorney's Office and Department of Agrarian Reform in Cataingan

- August 4 – The Senate Committee of the Whole begins its hearing on the alleged irregularities and fresh controversies hounding state-run Philippine Health Insurance Corporation (PhilHealth). On August 7, President Duterte formed a task force to investigate alleged corruption at the said agency. On August 18, Ombudsman Samuel Martires issued a six-month long preventive suspension against 13 PhilHealth officials. On August 24, PhilHealth senior vice president for the legal sector Rodolfo del Rosario Jr. tendered his irrevocable resignation from his post. On August 26, PhilHealth president and CEO Ricardo Morales resigned from his post amid allegations of corruption plaguing the state insurer and his battle with lymphoma. On August 31, President Duterte named former NBI chief Dante Gierran as the new head of PhilHealth. On September 14, President Duterte approved the recommendations of a task force to file criminal and administrative charges against Morales and several other executives in connection with irregularities in the state insurer. On October 2, the inter-agency task force created to investigate alleged anomalies in the said agency filed criminal complaints before the Office of the Ombudsman against Morales and several other agency officials over fund disbursements through the controversial Interim Reimbursement Mechanism (IRM), a system where advance releases are made to hospitals in case of unforeseen events. On October 8, PhilHealth announced that a total of 43 senior officers have either tendered their courtesy resignation or retired from service.
- August 6 – The government formally launched the One Hospital Command system which aims to improve the referral system and interoperability of public and private health care facilities catering to COVID-19 patients in the country.
- August 10 – Randall "Ka Randy" Echanis, the peasant activist and National Democratic Front of the Philippines (NDFP) peace consultant, was killed in Quezon City.
- August 13 – Abu Sayyaf Group (ASG) leader Anduljihad "Idang" Susukan, was arrested in Davao City.
- August 18 – A 6.6–magnitude earthquake hit the island of Masbate, leaving one person killed and injured 43 others.
- August 24 – At least 15 people were killed while 75 others were injured in twin bombings that ripped through Jolo, Sulu.
- August 25 – The Senate Blue Ribbon Committee, chaired by Senator Richard J. Gordon, announced and recommended the filing of criminal charges against former health secretary Janette Garin, former budget Secretary Florencio Abad and former Philippine Health Insurance Corporation (PhilHealth) president & CEO Alexander Padilla for allegedly diverting ₱10.6 billion of funds to construct barangay health centers and procure dental trucks which supposedly had not been utilized at all in December 2015.
- August 26 – Former Davao del Norte Representative Antonio "Tonyboy" Floirendo Jr., was convicted of graft over the deal between his family-owned Tagum Agricultural Development Co., Inc. and the Bureau of Corrections in 2003.
- August 28 - ABS-CBN Corporation decided closed already "ABS-CBN Regional" of North Luzon Laoag, Baguio, Dagupan, and Pampanga; South Luzon Batangas and Naga City; Metro Cebu of Central Visayas (One of the Originating Station in Visayas); Iloilo, Bacolod and Puerto Princesa of Whole Western Visayas and Tacloban of Eastern Visayas; Metro Davao of Southern Mindanao (One of the Originating Station in Mindanao); General Santos and Cotabato of South Central Mindanao, Cagayan de Oro of North Mindanao, and Western Mindanao Zamboanga as Final Broadcast of "Provincial Morning shows" and 12 "TV Patrol Regional".
- August 31 – Employees of ABS-CBN Corporation were retrenched and its businesses ceased.

=== September ===
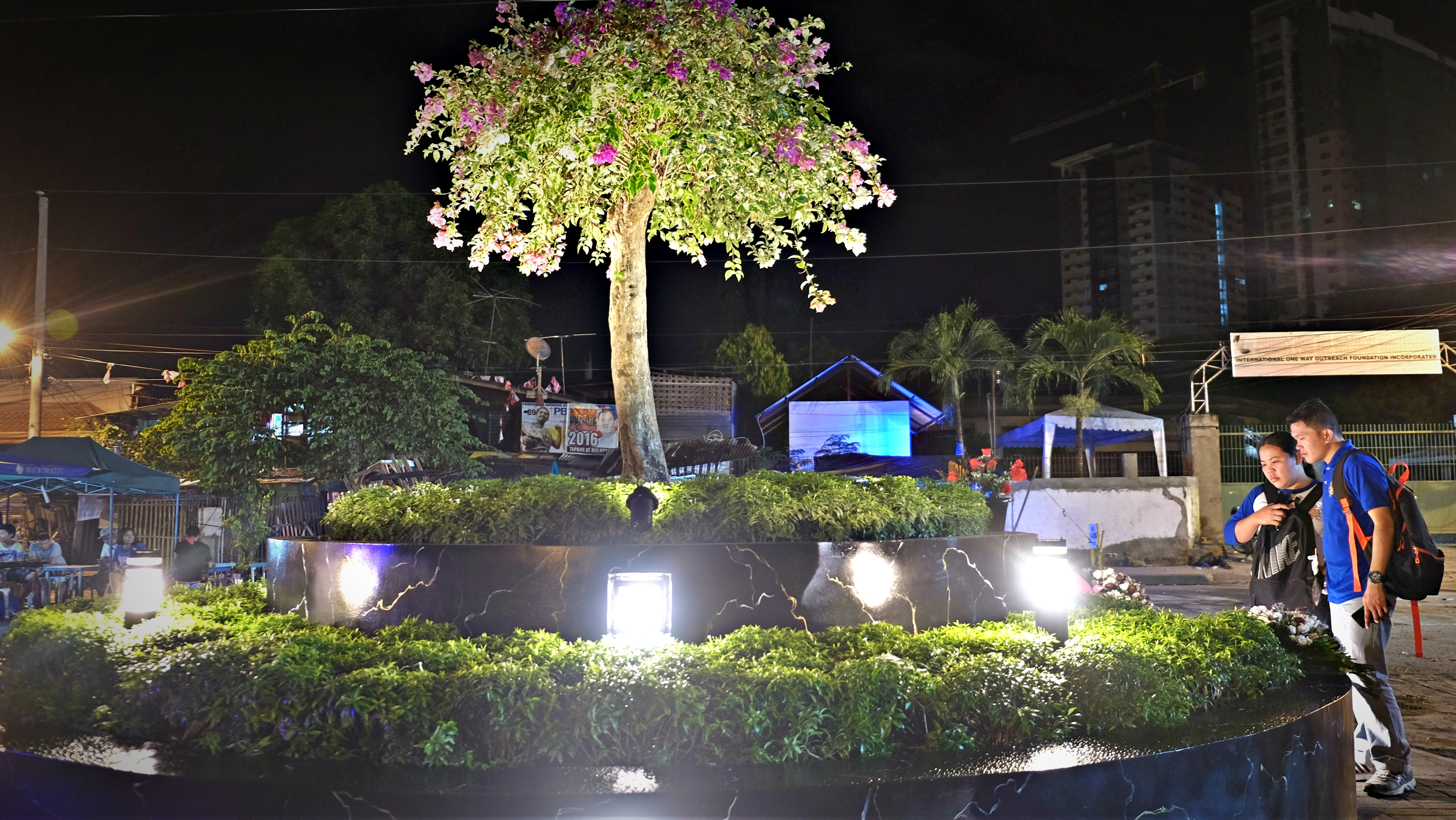
Memorial unveiled dedicated to the victims of the 2016 Davao City bombing

- September 1:
  - The Senate Committee of the Whole, announced and recommended the filing of criminal charges against former PhilHealth chief Ricardo Morales, Health Secretary Francisco Duque III and several other officials over the alleged irregularities in the state health insurer.
  - The Supreme Court dismissed a petition of Citizens Urgent Response to End COVID-19 (CURE COVID-19), that asking the tribunal to compel the government to conduct proactive mass testing for COVID-19, efficient contact tracing and isolation, and effective treatment of positive cases.
  - The Office of the Ombudsman issued Memorandum Circular No. 1, that limited the public access to Statements of Assets, Liabilities and Net Worth (SALN) of government officials, allowing release only for official investigations, by court order, or upon authority from officials themselves.
- September 3 – The Department of Environment and Natural Resources (DENR) begins its dumping of powdery-white sand on the baywalk of Manila Bay as part of the rehabilitation program of the said bay. The ₱389-million beautification project received criticism from the environmental groups. On September 8, Cebu Governor Gwendolyn Garcia issued a cease and desist order on two companies involved in the extraction and sale of the dolomite used in the said beautification project.
- September 7 – President Duterte granted an absolute pardon to US Marine Lance Corporal Joseph Scott Pemberton who was convicted of killing of transgender Filipino woman Jennifer Laude in 2014. On September 13, the Bureau of Immigration deported Pemberton from the Philippines.
- September 8 – The Department of Agriculture (DA) formally named Davao City, hometown of President Duterte, as the Cacao Capital of the Philippines.
- September 9 – The Supreme Court unanimously denied the petition of attorney Larry Gadon that seeks to nullify the law that renamed Manila International Airport as Ninoy Aquino International Airport.
- September 11 – President Duterte signed the Bayanihan to Recover as One Act (Republic Act No. 11494), which provides a COVID-19 relief package worth ₱165.5 billion.
- September 15:
  - The Supreme Court rejected a request of Larry Gadon and the Office of the Solicitor General to secure the statements of assets, liabilities and net worth (SALN) of SC Associate Justice Marvic Leonen for a possible quo warranto petition.
  - The Supreme Court junked the plea for protective writs filed by Francis and Relissa Lucena, the parents of Alicia Jasper Lucena, the alleged missing activist after it was found out that she was not missing after all.
- September 16:
  - Former Supreme Court Senior Associate Justice Antonio Carpio joined Former Foreign Affairs Secretary Albert del Rosario and Ombudsman Conchita Carpio-Morales in a landmark case seeking to punish Chinese leader Xi Jinping over his country's destructive activities in the South China Sea.
  - The European Parliament adopted a resolution urging the Philippine government to drop charges against Rappler chief Maria Ressa and renew the franchise of ABS-CBN Corporation.
  - Four personnel of the Philippine Air Force (PAF) were killed after a military helicopter was crashed in Lantawan, Basilan.
- September 22 – The Sandiganbayan upheld its December 2019 decision ordering associates of the late dictator Ferdinand Marcos to return assets off their shares in Eastern Telecommunications Philippines, Inc. (ETPI) to the Philippine government for being ill-gotten.
- September 23 – Facebook removed a network of fake accounts and pages allegedly linked to the Philippine military and police due to coordinated inauthentic behavior (CIB), a violation of its community standards.
- September 29:
  - The Taguig Regional Trial Court Branch 266 convicted seven men of multiple murder and multiple attempted murder over the deadly explosion at the Roxas Night Market in Davao City in 2016.
- September 30:
  - Voted 184–1–9, members of the House of Representatives rejected House Speaker Alan Peter Cayetano's offer of resignation in a swift move that came in the wake of reports that his term-sharing agreement with Marinduque Rep. Lord Allan Velasco was to take effect in October.
  - The Supreme Court, sitting as the Presidential Electoral Tribunal, required the Commission on Elections and the Office of the Solicitor General to comment on pending issues in the election protest filed by defeated candidate Bongbong Marcos against Vice President Leni Robredo.

=== October ===
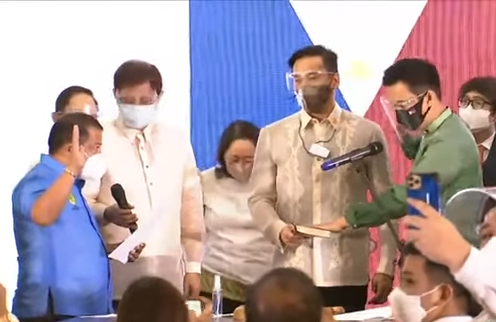
Lord Allan Jay Velasco taking his oath of office as House Speaker on October 12, 2020

- October 1 – The Sandiganbayan cleared Terence King Ong, the head of slipper maker Kentex Manufacturing Corporation as well as Valenzuela City fire officials of criminal charges in connection with the May 13, 2015 factory fire that left at least 74 people dead and scores other injured.
- October 5 – The start of the 2020–21 school year in public schools officially begun - a few months later than usual due to the COVID-19 pandemic.
- October 12–13 – 2020 Philippine House of Representatives leadership crisis: 186 majority members of the House of Representatives elect Lord Allan Jay Velasco as Speaker of the House of Representatives, unseating incumbent Alan Peter Cayetano amidst the political dispute over the Speakership outside the Session Hall of the Batasang Pambansa Complex. Cayetano declares Velasco's election as "illegal" and maintains that he is the Speaker. The crisis was later ended the next day when Rep. Cayetano announced his resignation from his post after lawmakers formally installed Velasco as their new leader at the Batasang Pambansa.
- October 12 – The Philippine Statistics Authority begun its preregistration for the national identification (ID) system, with a target to register 10 million people.
- October 23 – Former acting chair of the Local Water Utilities Administration (LWUA) and Surigao del Sur Representative Prospero Pichay Jr. and two others were convicted of graft over the LWUA's illegal grant of ₱1.5 million in government funds to the National Chess Federation of the Philippines (NCFP) in 2010.
- October 25–26 – Typhoon Molave (Quinta) hits Bicol Region and Southern Luzon, resulting to damages of at least ₱4 billion.
- October 31 – Super Typhoon Goni (Rolly) makes landfall in Catanduanes. It was the strongest tropical cyclone observed worldwide in 2020 and broke 1-minute wind records. It results to more than ₱17 billion worth of damages.

=== November ===
- November 11 – Typhoon Vamco (Ulysses) makes landfalls on the island town of Patnanungan, Burdeos and on General Nakar in the Luzon landmass as a high-end Category 2-equivalent typhoon. It results to more than ₱20 billion worth of damages.
- November 13 – A water level of 192.7 metres (632 ft), 0.3 meters below the dam's spilling point, forced the Magat Dam to continue releasing water. All seven gates of the dam were opened at 24 meters as the dam released over 5,037 cubic metres (1,331,000 US gal) of water into the Cagayan River as numerous riverside towns experienced massive flooding.

=== December ===
- December 9 – The Anti-Terrorism Council issues resolutions, which will be made public later that month, formally declaring the Communist Party of the Philippines and New People's Army, as well as groups affiliated with the Islamic State, as terrorists.
- December 15 – The International Criminal Court accuses the Philippines of crimes against humanity in its war on drugs.
- December 20 – Police officer Jonel Nuezca fatally shoots civilians Sonya Gregorio and her son, Frank, in Paniqui, Tarlac, causing renewed discussion over police brutality.

== Holidays ==
On November 15, 2019, the government announced at least 18 Philippine holidays for 2020 as declared by virtue of Proclamation No. 845, series of 2019.

=== Regular ===
- January 1 – New Year's Day
- April 9:
  - Araw ng Kagitingan (Day of Valor)
  - Maundy Thursday
- April 10 – Good Friday
- May 1 – Labor Day
- May 25 – Eid'l Fitr (Feast of Ramadan)
- June 12 – Independence Day
- July 31 – Eid'l Adha (Feast of Sacrifice)
- August 31 – National Heroes Day
- November 30 – Bonifacio Day
- December 25 – Christmas Day
- December 30 – Rizal Day

=== Special (Non-working) ===
- January 25 – Chinese New Year
- February 25 – 1986 EDSA Revolution
- April 11 – Black Saturday
- August 21 – Ninoy Aquino Day
- November 1 – All Saints Day
- November 2 – Special non-working holiday
- December 8 – Feast of the Immaculate Conception
- December 24 – Special non-working holiday
- December 31 – Last day of the year (in observance of New Year's celebrations)

== Business and economy ==
- March 9 – The Philippine Stock Exchange (PSE) index lost 457.77 points or 6.76% in the 2020 stock market crash, its steepest decline since the 2008 financial crisis.
- April 10 – The World Bank approved a $500-million policy loan to boost the Philippines' capacity to respond and recover from disasters such as the ongoing coronavirus disease 2019 (COVID-19) crisis.
- April 23 – The World Bank approves a $100-million or ₱5.1 billion loan for the Philippines' COVID-19 Emergency Response Project. On April 28, the Philippines and the World Bank signed the said loan agreement for the country's COVID-19 Emergency Response Project.
- April 28 – The Philippines and the Asian Development Bank (ADB) signed an agreement for a $200-million loan for additional funding for the government's emergency cash assistance program to poor and vulnerable households hit by quarantine measures imposed to contain COVID-19 spread.
- May 2 – President Duterte signs Executive Order No. 113, that temporarily increased tariffs on imported crude oil and refined petroleum products to fund the country's COVID-19 response.
- May 7:
  - The Philippine economy contracted by 0.2% in the first quarter of 2020, for the first time since 1998, due to the COVID-19 pandemic and resulting lockdown.
  - Fitch Ratings downgraded its outlook on the Philippines to factor in the impact of the global health crisis brought about by the coronavirus disease 2019 (COVID-19).
- May 15 – The Energy Regulatory Commission (ERC) ordered the Manila Electric Corporation (Meralco) to explain how it came up with consumers' electricity bills during the three billing cycles covering the lockdown periods.
- May 16 – ABS-CBN Corporation resumed its trading of shares after complying with the disclosure requirements of the Philippine Stock Exchange (PSE).
- May 21 – The Philippines is experiencing a shortage of onion and garlic as local farmers are unable to "produce much" of the crops amid the coronavirus disease 2019 (COVID-19) pandemic.
- May 28 – The Asian Infrastructure Investment Bank (AIIB) approved a $750 million (37.9 billion) loan to the Philippines to help the country cope with the COVID-19 pandemic.
- May 29 – The World Bank approved a new $500-million policy loan to boost the Philippines' capacity to mitigate the impact of the coronavirus disease (COVID-19) pandemic on poor and vulnerable households and to provide financial relief to small and medium enterprises. On June 3, the Philippines and the World Bank signed the said policy loan agreement to ease the social and economic impact of COVID-19 on poor households and workers of micro, small, and medium enterprises (MSMEs).
- June 3 – The Land Bank of the Philippines approved some ₱250 million in loans under its ₱3-billion credit support for private academic institutions to provide a "study now, pay later" scheme to students hit by the COVID-19 pandemic.
- June 5:
  - The Philippines and the Asian Development Bank (ADB) signed a $400-million loan agreement that supports the government's efforts to strengthen domestic capital markets as the country recovers from the economic fallout resulting from the COVID-19 pandemic.
  - The number of jobless Filipinos hit record-high of 17.7%, in April as the economic impact of the coronavirus disease 2019 caused the displacement of millions of workers.
- July 1 – The Philippines signed a $26.5-million Asian Development Bank (ADB) loan which would finance the reforms needed to improve local property valuation and tax collection.
- July 29 – The Bangko Sentral ng Pilipinas (BSP) officially launched the enhanced new generation currency (NGC) banknotes, which the central bank said features the latest anti-counterfeiting technology.
- August 6 – The Philippine economy plunged further in the second quarter to mark its worst performance on record based on the available data since 1981, bringing the country to a technical recession amid the COVID-19 pandemic.
- August 24 – The Philippines signed a €24.5-million financing agreement with the European Union, its third so far this year, to finance initiatives in the Bangsamoro region and assist in the rehabilitation of Marawi City.
- August 25:
  - The Asian Development Bank approved another $125 million (₱6 billion) loan to boost the Philippines' capacity to prevent and control the spread of COVID-19.
  - Shakey's Pizza Asia Ventures Inc. announced that they are entered into a franchise agreement with Singapore's Koufu Group Ltd. to bring the R&B milk tea brand to the Philippines.
  - The Philippine Competition Commission (PCC) approved the acquisition of a controlling stake in Manila Water Inc. by Enrique Razon-led Trident Water Holdings Company Inc., the holding firm of Prime Metroline Holdings Inc. (PMHI).
- September 15 – Olivia Limpe-Aw and Melanie Perkins, the two Filipina businesswomens were included in the Forbes Asia's 2020 Power Businesswomen List, which features 25 outstanding female leaders in the Asia-Pacific region.
- September 16 – The Supreme Court decided in favor of billionaire Enrique Razon's MORE Electric and Power Corp. (MORE) in a legal battle involving power distribution in Iloilo City.
- September 24 – Eugenio "Gabby" Lopez III tendered his resignation for personal reasons as Chairman Emeritus and Director of ABS-CBN Corporation and other Lopez-owned companies.
- October 5 – The Department of Transportation (DOTr) suspended the mandatory use of Beep cards at the EDSA Busway, with stakeholders scrambling to look for other service providers that can suit the demands.
- October 15 – Oil exploration activities in the South China Sea resumed after President Duterte approves the recommendation of the Department of Energy (DOE) to lift the suspension of petroleum activities in the disputed waters.

== Health ==
- January 30 – The Philippines confirmed its first case of COVID-19.
- February 1 – The first COVID-19 death outside China was reported in the Philippines: a Chinese tourist who recently arrived in the country.
- February 21 – The DOJ indicted former Health secretary Janette Garin and several other health officials over children's deaths allegedly linked to the dengue vaccine Dengvaxia.
- March 6 – The DOH confirmed that two Filipinos tested positive for COVID-19 for the first time in the Philippines. On March 7, the DOH and WHO confirms that the Philippines' fifth confirmed COVID-19 patient is the first case of local transmission.
- March 10 – The FDA approves the use of test kits developed by scientists at the University of the Philippines to confirm cases of COVID-19 in the country. On April 3, the FDA approves the said test kits for COVID-19 developed by UP-National Institutes of Health and manufactured by Manila HealthTek, Inc. On May 20, Health Undersecretary Maria Rosario Vergeire announced, that the University of the Philippines-National Institutes of Health (UP-NIH) had recalled its locally made coronavirus test kits over "very minor" defects. On July 19, DOH announced that the COVID-19 test kit developed by the University of the Philippines was approved for commercial use.
- March 11 – The first Filipino COVID-19 patient death, was reported in the Philippines. The victim was a 67-year-old female who was confined at the Manila Doctors Hospital.
- October 6 – Health Secretary Francisco Duque III was elected as chairperson for the World Health Organization's Regional Committee for the Western Pacific.

== Sports ==
- February 11–16, Badminton – Badminton Asia Team Championships
- March 12 – The major sports leagues across the country announce a temporary suspension or termination of play in an attempt to slow the spread of the COVID-19 pandemic.
- March 19 – The NCAA officially terminated Season 95 due to COVID-19.
- April 7 – The UAAP Board decided to cancel Season 82, following of the extension of the enhanced community quarantine amid COVID-19.
- April 29 – The Philippine Sports Commission (PSC) announced the cancellation of all sporting events until December 2020, amid the threat of COVID-19.
- May 5 – The Department of Education (DepEd) announced the suspension of the annual interschool sports tournament Palarong Pambansa and other events that draw large crowds as a precaution against the spread of COVID-19.
- May 8 – The 10th ASEAN Para Games which was rescheduled to October 3–9 of this year, been officially cancelled due to COVID-19.
- June 1 – The Maharlika Pilipinas Basketball League (MPBL) officially canceled its 2019–2020 season, citing the restrictions caused by the COVID-19 crisis as well as the uncertainty surrounding the franchise renewal of ABS-CBN.
- November 27 – Philippine Olympic Committee elections
- December 11 – The University Athletic Association of the Philippines announced the cancellation of its 83rd season due to the COVID-19 pandemic in the Philippines.

== Entertainment and culture ==
- January 10–12 – The Philippines hosted the 24th Asian Television Awards, the first to be held in the country.
- February 6 – Binibining Pilipinas released the official list of the 40 candidates for the 2020 pageant.
- February 9 – Miss Philippines Katrina Llegado wins the title of 5th runner-up in the Reina Hispanoamericana 2019 pageant which was held in Bolivia.
- February 14 – The Miss Universe Philippines (MUP) organization introduced the 46 official candidates for the 2020 pageant.
- February 18 – Dual-voiced Filipino singer Marcelito Pomoy was named as 3rd runner up for the well renowned US talent competition America's Got Talent: The Champions.
- February 22 – The coronation event of the Manhunt International 2020 pageant takes place at the New Frontier Theatre in Quezon City. For the second time that the Philippines hosted the event. Paul Luzineau of Netherlands was crowned as Manhunt International 2020.
- February 27 – Luzon, the largest island in the Philippines, was recognized the world's second Trending Destination by TripAdvisor in its 2020 Travellers' Choice Awards.
- March 5 – Former President Corazon Aquino and Rappler CEO Maria Ressa have been included in Time Magazine's 100 Most Influential Women of the century.
- March 8 – Cristine Reyes wins the best actress award at the 40th edition of the Porto International Film Festival for her performance in the movie Untrue.
- March 16 – The acclaimed film Write About Love, about screenwriters who fall in love in the process of collaborating, was recognized at the 2020 Osaka Asian Film Festival (OAFF).
- April 2 – Five Philippine representatives were included in Forbes 30 Under 30 Asia Class of 2020, joining a list of Asia's top young entrepreneurs and change-makers.
- April 8 – 26-year-old Ryan Gersava of Sultan Kudarat topped the World Summit Awards (WSA) Global Champion under the Young Innovators category for 2020 with his virtual school for persons with disabilities and other disadvantaged sectors.
- April 22 – Three ABS-CBN News documentaries and two GMA Public Affairs documentaries won medals in the prestigious 2020 New York Festivals TV & Film Awards.
- April 28 – ABS-CBN stars Liza Soberano and Ivana Alawi are among the early nominees in the 2020 edition of 100 Most Beautiful Faces, an international list driven by social media.
- May 6 – Cebu-based artist Maria Victoria "Bambi" Beltran was selected as one of 17 laureates of the 2020 Deutsche Welle (DW) Freedom of Speech Award.
- May 29 – Binibining Pilipinas candidate Maureen Montagne declined the Miss Eco International 2019 title after reigning queen Suheyn Cipriani of Peru got dethroned due to pregnancy.
- May 31 – The Philippines landed on Forbes' list of Rising Stars in Travel, one of seven countries cited to have potential to become major tourist destinations.
- June 18 – The Diocese of Maasin in Southern Leyte was acknowledged by the Vatican for being the first in the Catholic Church to switch to renewable energy.
- June 25 – Pope Francis appointed four priests of the Archdiocese of Lingayen–Dagupan as the Catholic Church's new "Missionaries of Mercy."
- June 30:
  - Lumad Joeffrey S. Mambucon became the first Tigwahanon-Manobo doctor of medicine.
  - A fossil megalodon tooth was found in Maribojoc, Bohol.
- July 5 – Roxanne Allison Baeyens, was crowned as Miss Philippines Earth 2020, during the coronation event of the Miss Philippines Earth 2020, which was held for the first time through virtual contest.
- July 8 – Palawan reclaimed the top spot in Travel + Leisure's "World's Best Islands" list for 2020 after getting the most votes from the magazine's readers.
- July 21 – Liza Diño, the head of the Film Development Council of the Philippines (FDCP), was removed from the executive committee of the Metro Manila Film Festival (MMFF).
- July 26:
  - Cinemalaya 2019 audience choice awardee for full-length feature "Belle Douleur" is nominated in the 2020 Santorini Film Festival.
  - Tiffany Grace Uy, the University of the Philippines' highest grade record holder since World War II in June 2015, graduated from the UP College of Medicine Class of 2020 with Latin honors anew.
- July 27 – "Here, Here", a short film directed by Joanne Cesario, was selected for the 2020 Locarno Film Festival's Pardi di domani international competition.
- July 28:
  - Miss World Philippines announced that it acquired the Miss Supranational beauty pageant and will be sending representatives to the Poland-based pageant.
  - Filipina dancer Andree Camille "AC" Bonifacio won 2nd place in Blackpink's "How You Like That" dance cover contest.
- August 16 – Heart Salvador, Cydel Gabutero, Isang Manlapaz and Kendra Aguirre, were declared as the winners of the second season of The Voice Teens.
- August 19 – The National Historical Commission of the Philippines (NHCP) sustained its findings that Limasawa Island in Southern Leyte was the site of the 1521 Easter Sunday Mass, the first Catholic mass in the country.
- October 10 – ZOE TV channel 11 was rebranded to A2Z, which feature some contents of programs from its selected blocktimers (ABS-CBN and Knowledge Channel), licensors and providers (CBN Asia, Trinity Broadcasting Network and others), and ZOE's owned Light TV on the said network, after ABS-CBN and ZOE agreed with the entering of blocktime deal on October 6. This also marks the return of ABS-CBN programmings on free TV after the cease-and-desist order by National Telecommunications Commission due to expired legislative franchise on May 5 and the denial of its renewed legislative franchise on July 10.
- October 25 – The first coronation event of the Miss Universe Philippines 2020 pageant was held at the Baguio Country Club and Cordillera Convention Hall in Baguio. Rabiya Mateo of Iloilo City was crowned as Miss Universe Philippines 2020.

== Deaths ==
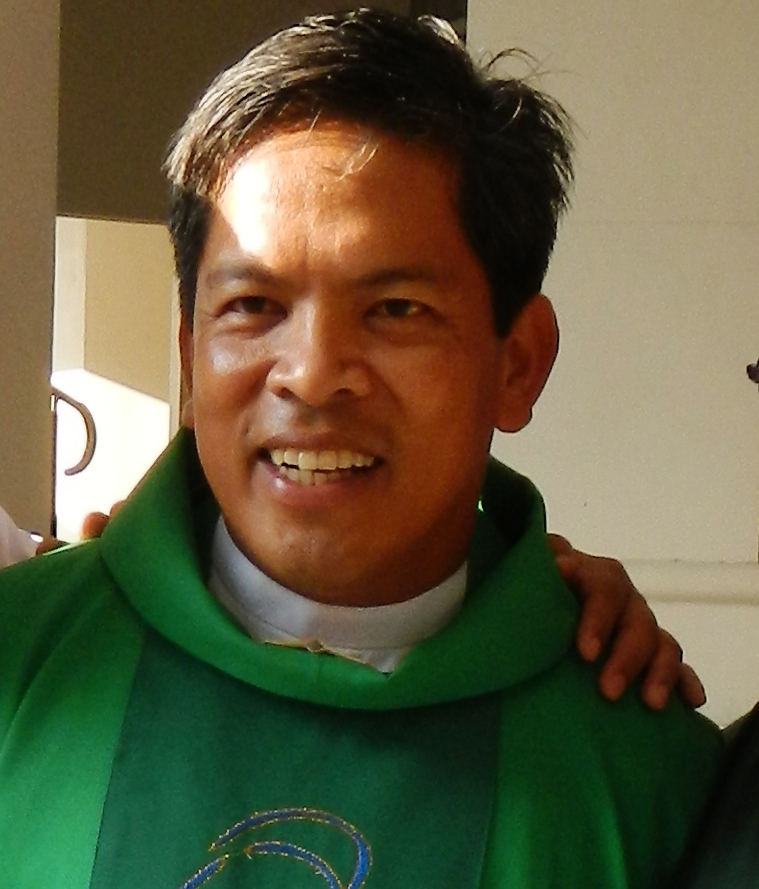
Fernando Suarez

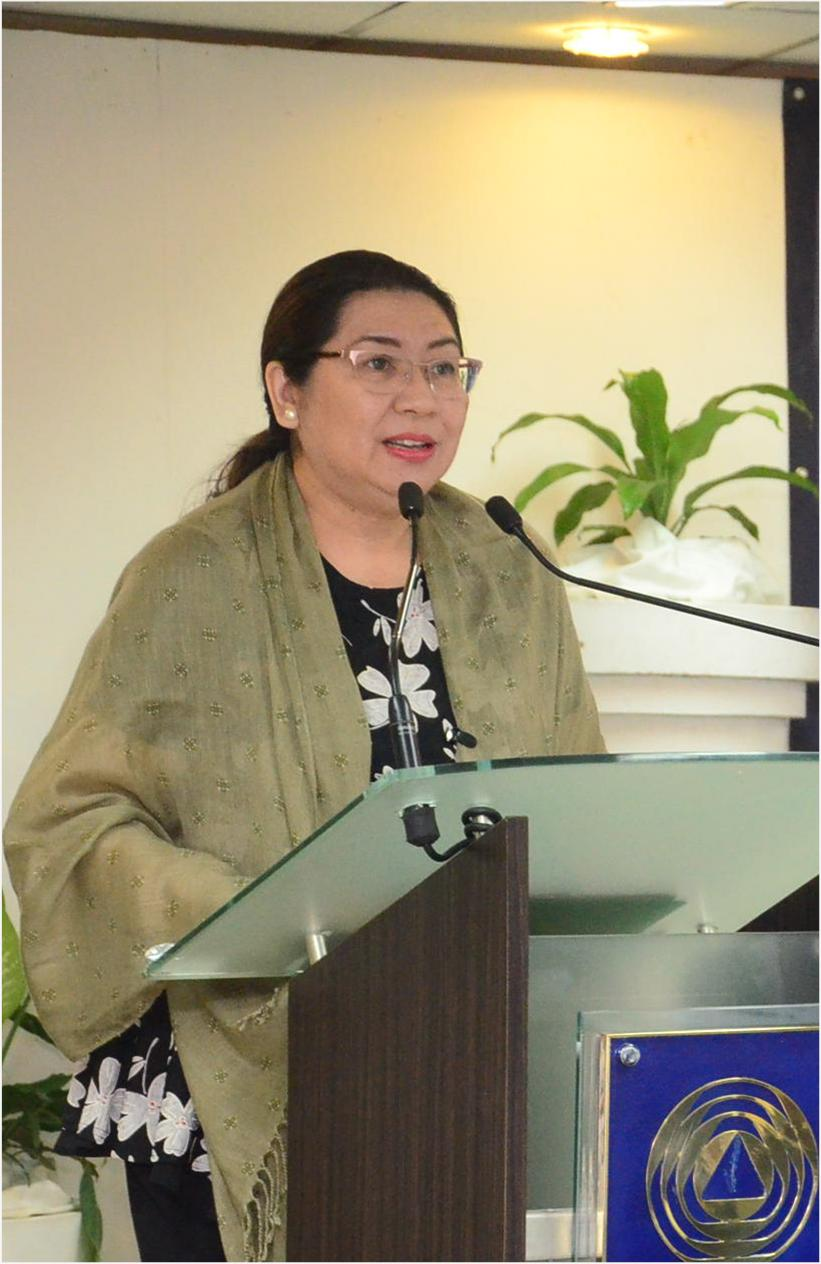
Aileen Baviera

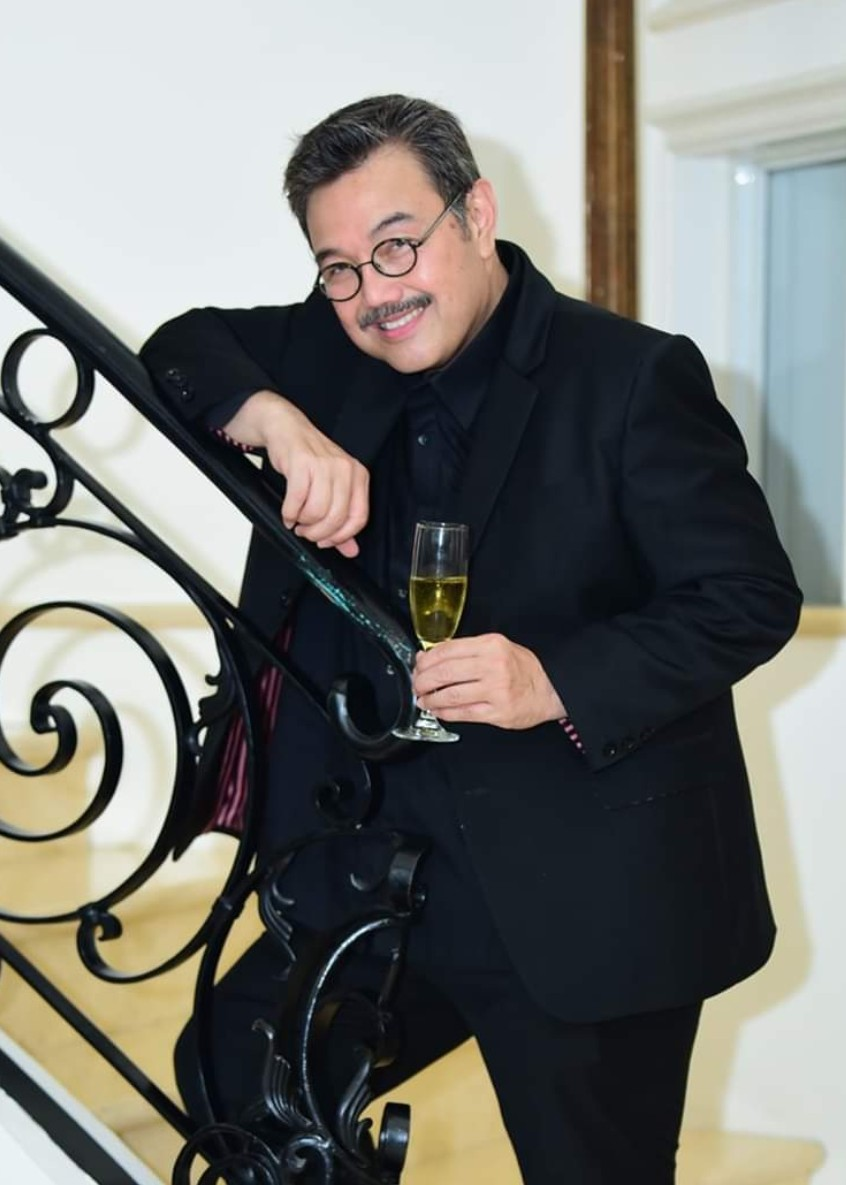
Ito Curata

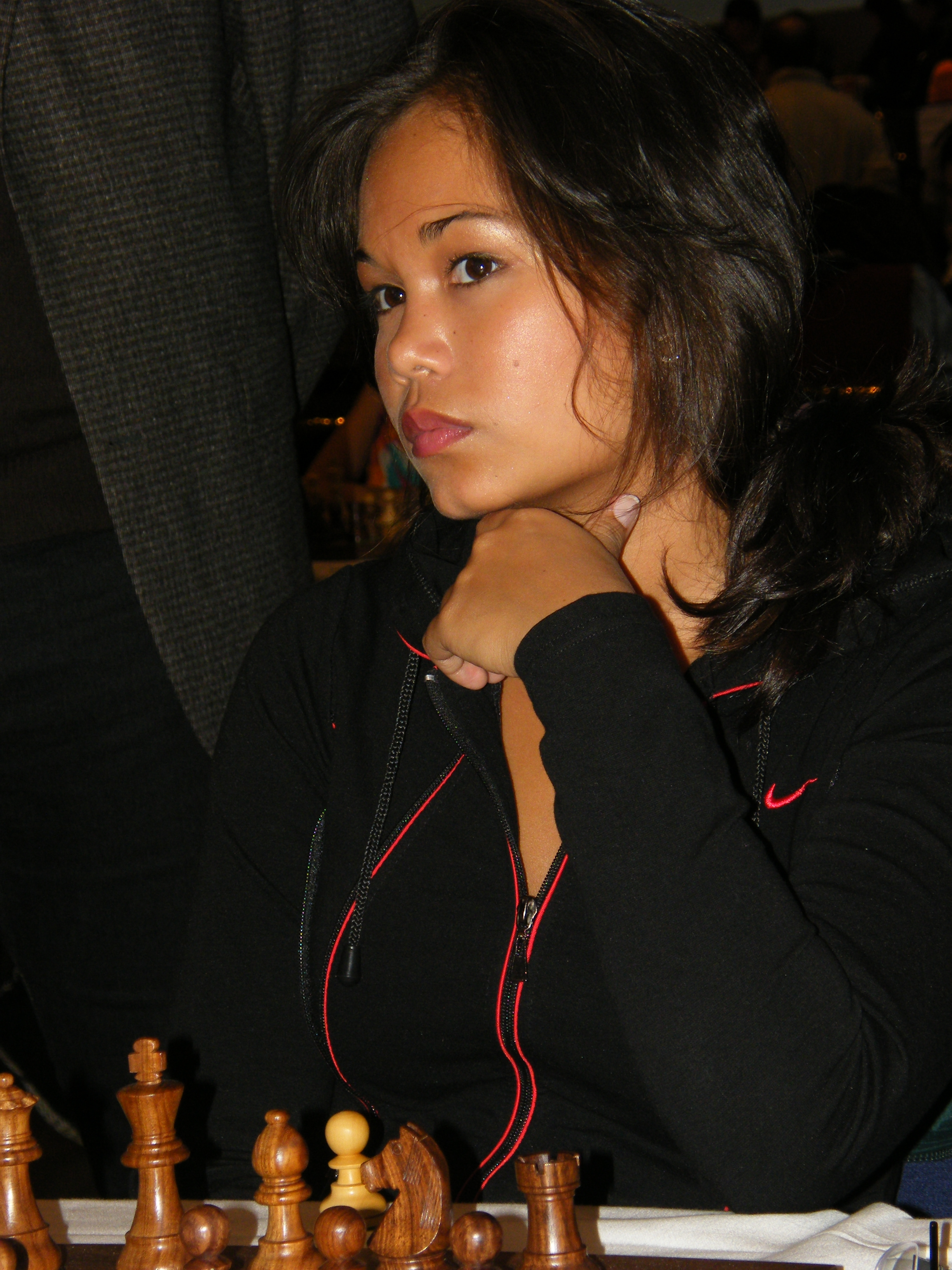
Arianne Caoili

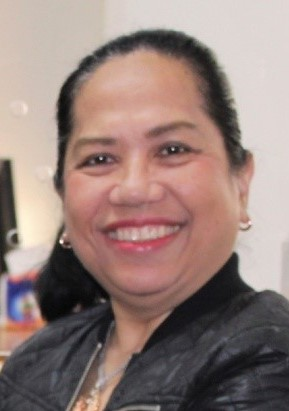
Bernardita Catalla

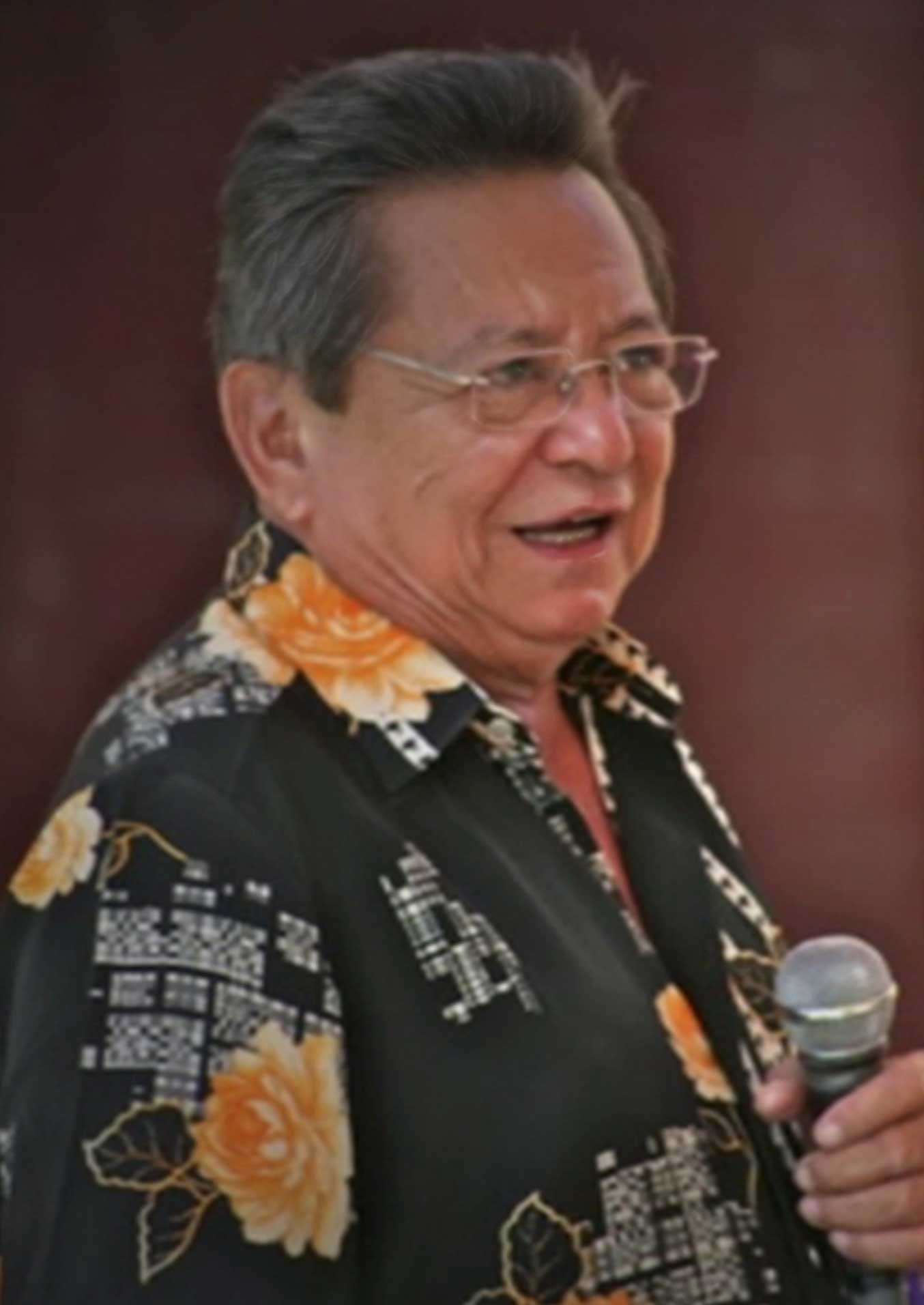
Vicente Magsaysay

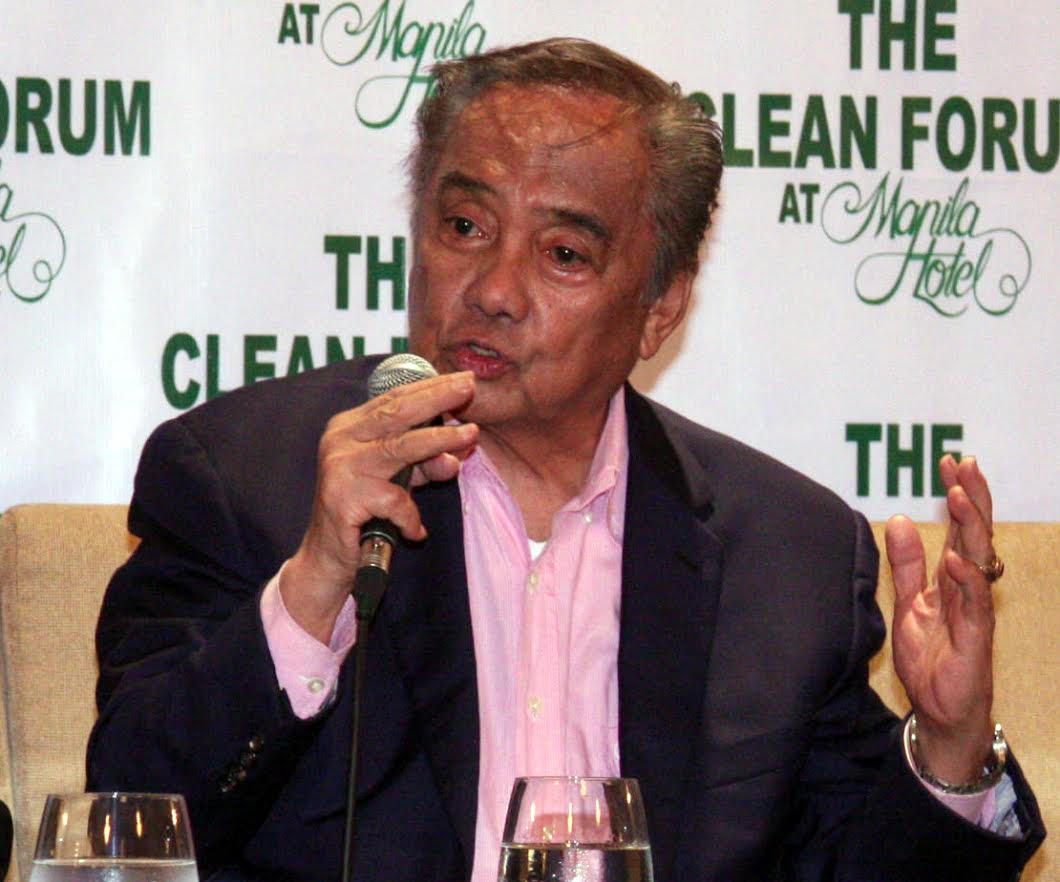
Heherson Alvarez

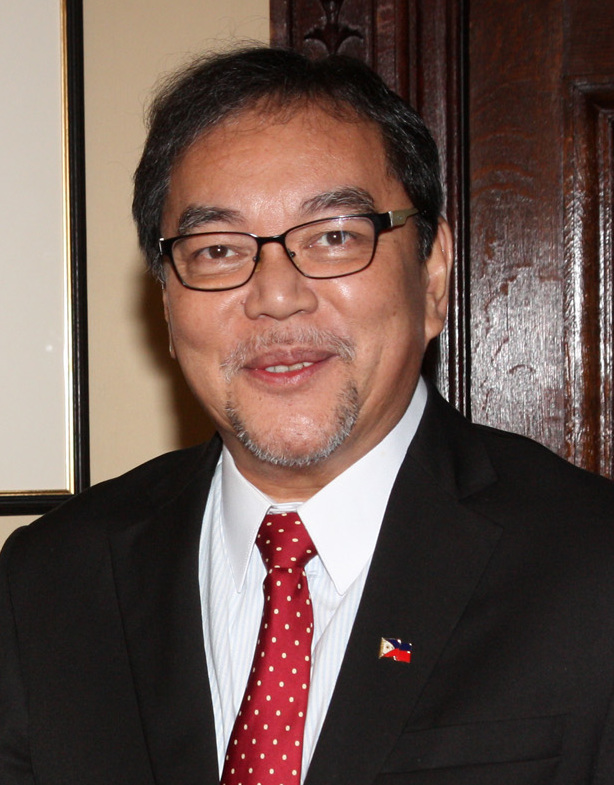
Ramon Jimenez Jr.

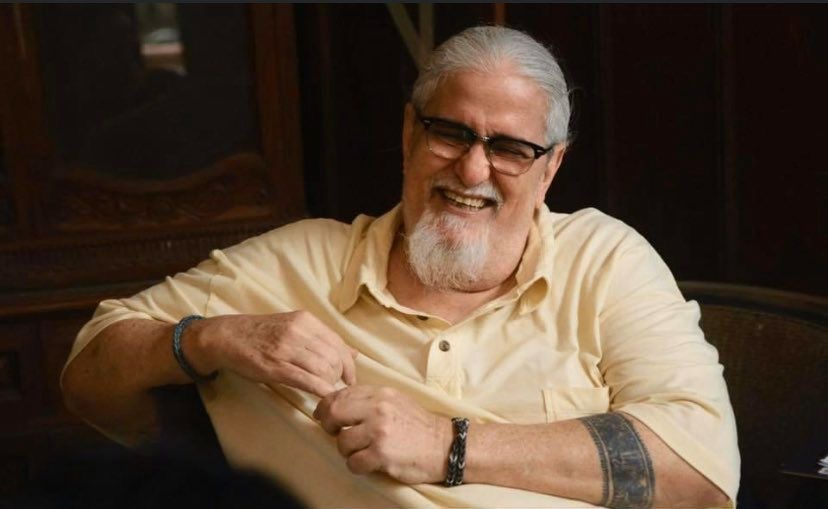
Peque Gallaga

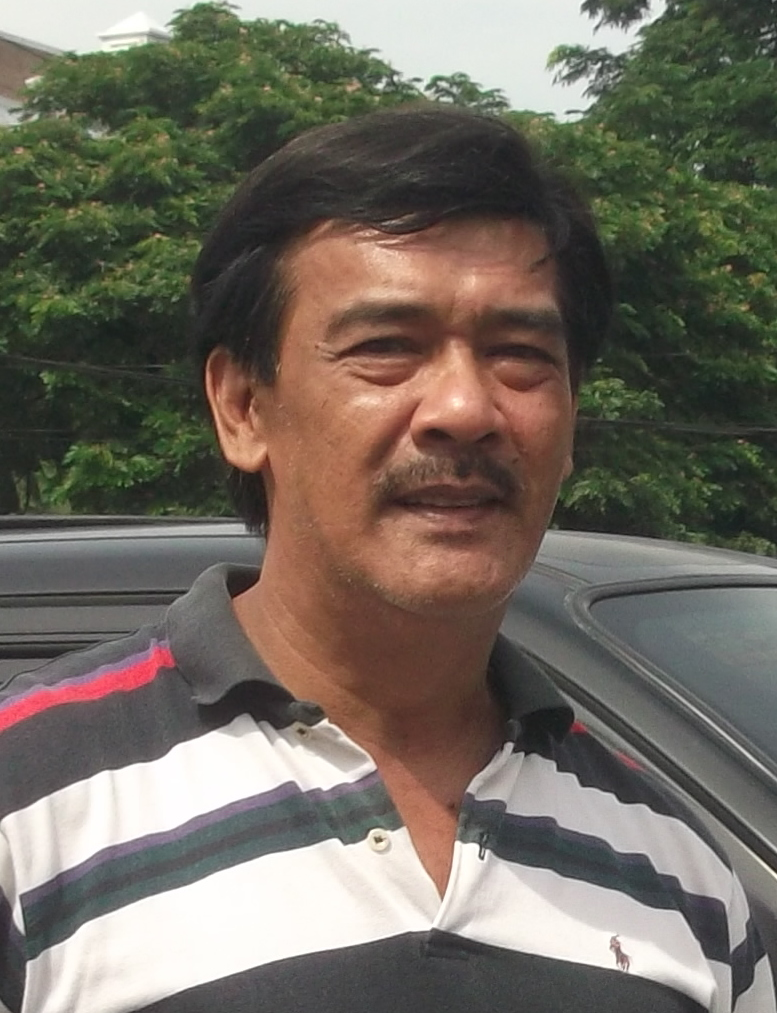
Sonny Parsons

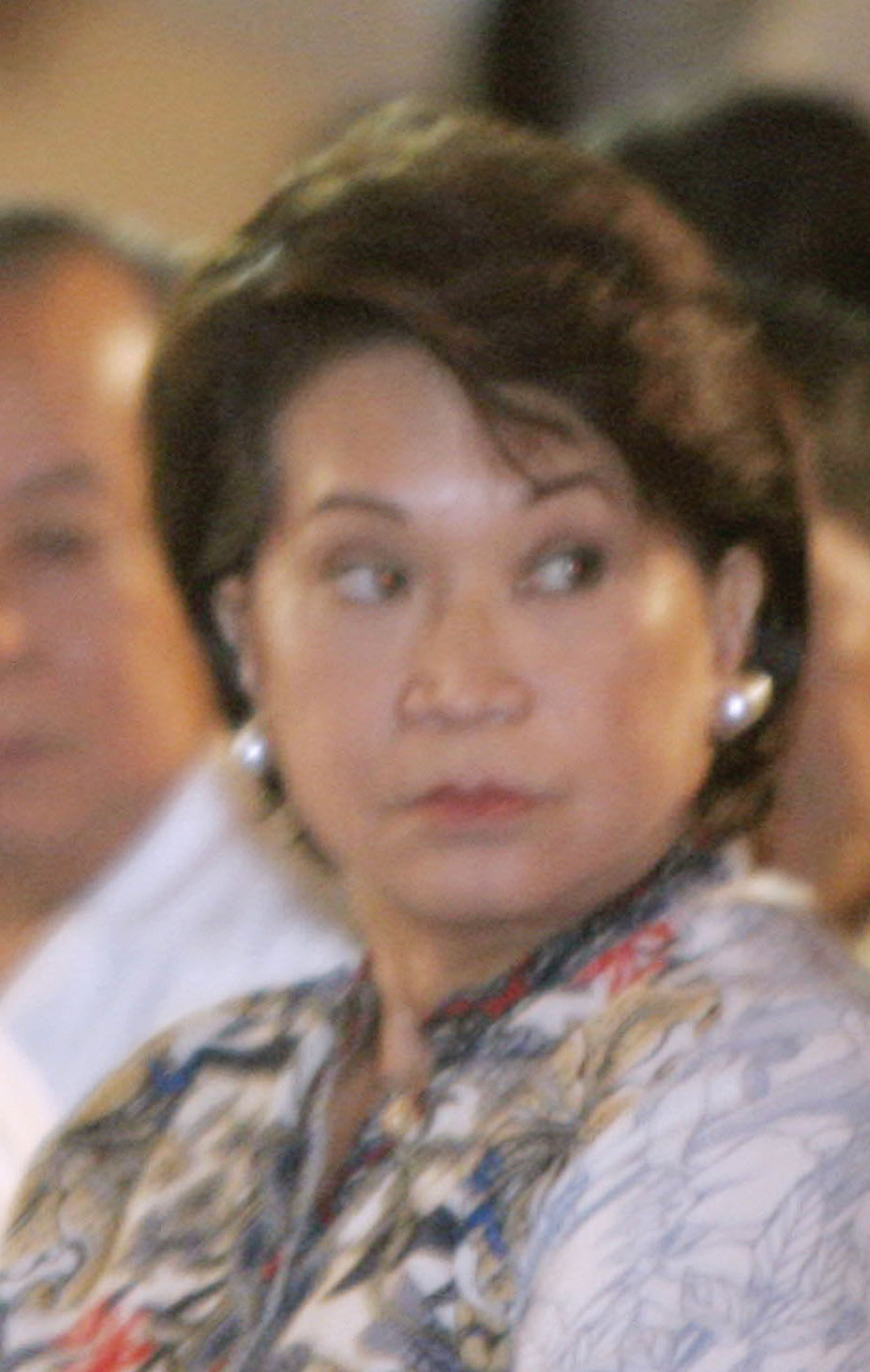
Teresa Aquino-Oreta

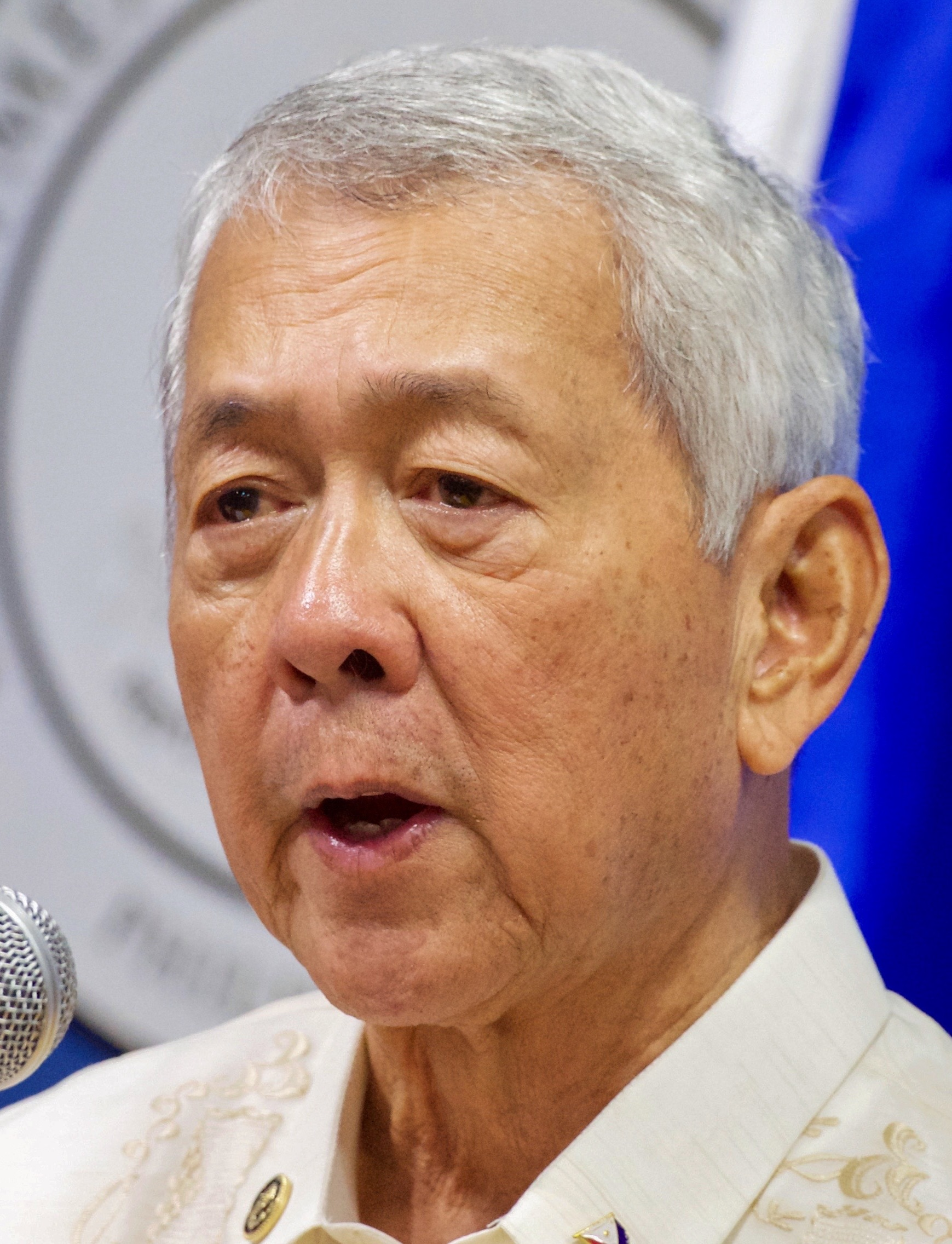
Perfecto Yasay Jr.

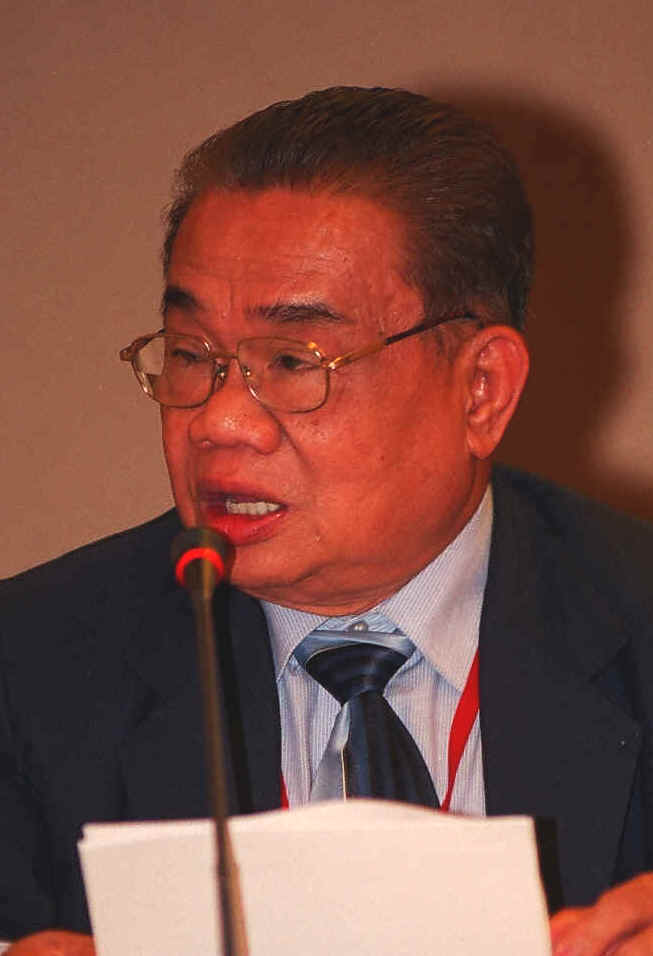
Resurreccion Borra

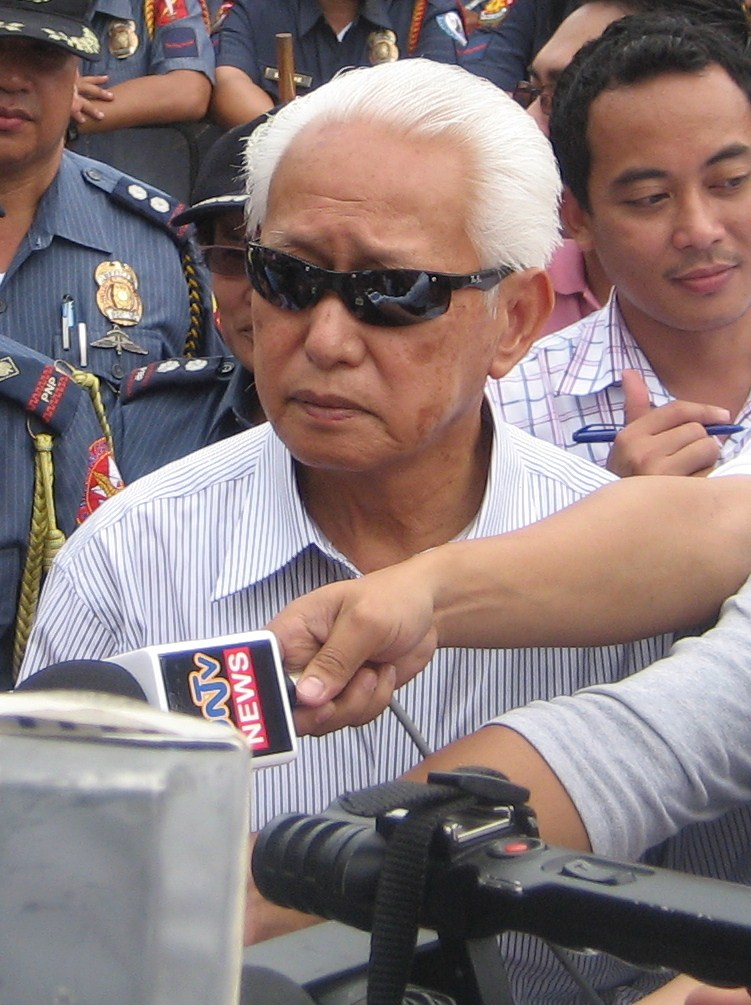
Alfredo Lim

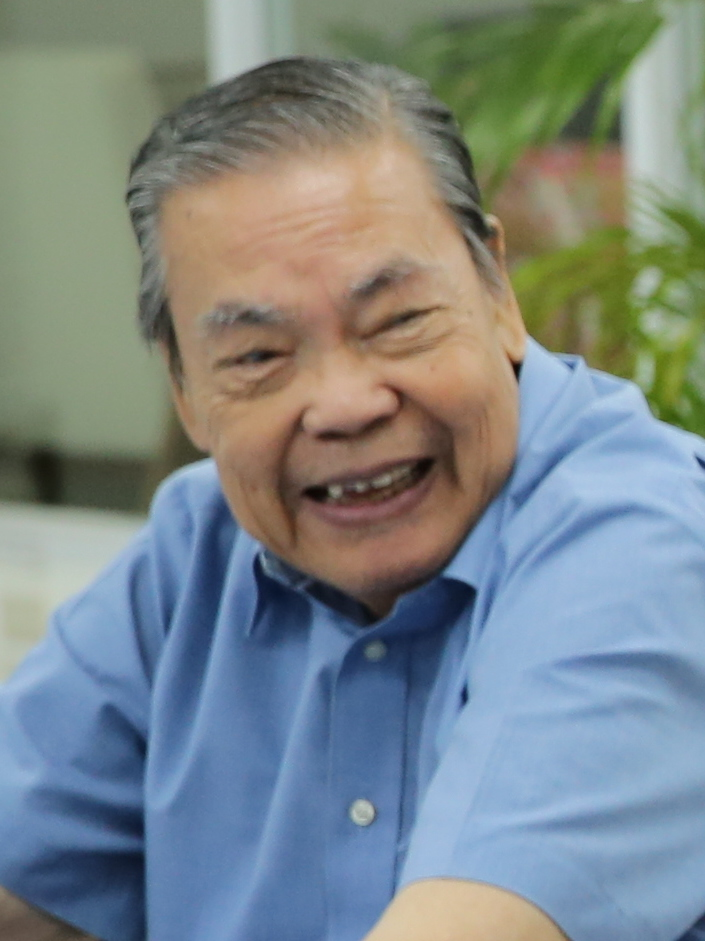
Eddie Ilarde

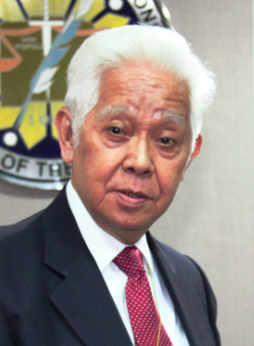
Sixto Brillantes

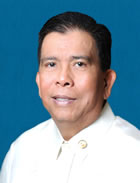
Arnulfo Fuentebella

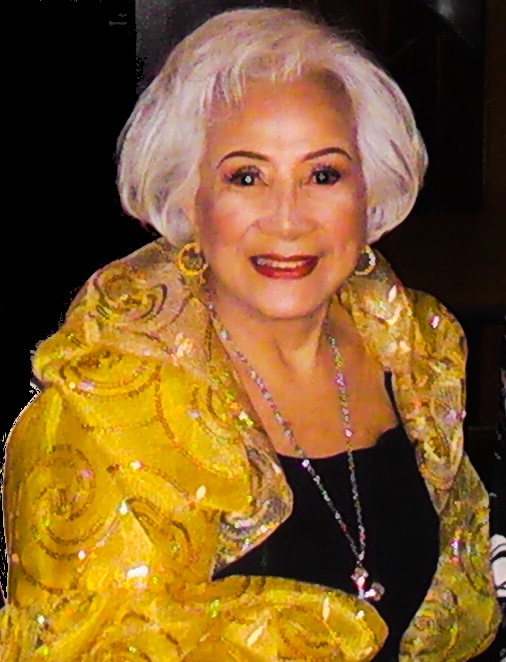
Mila del Sol

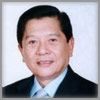
Raul del Mar

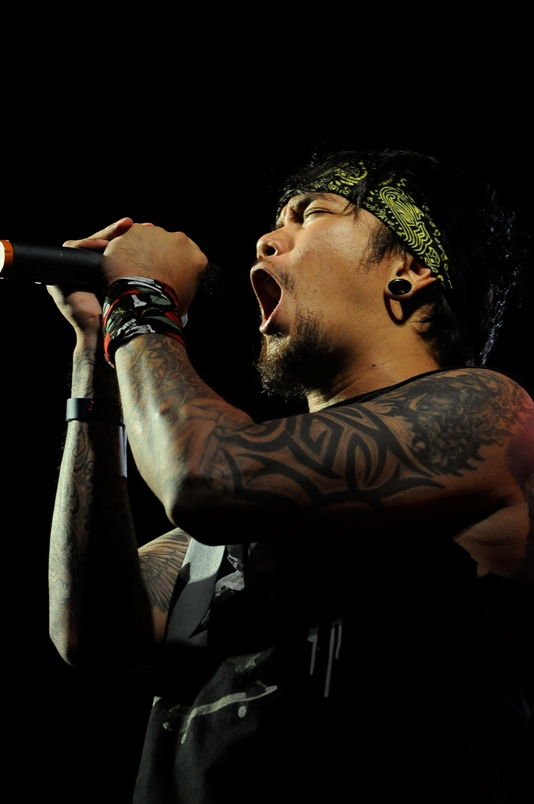
Jamir Garcia

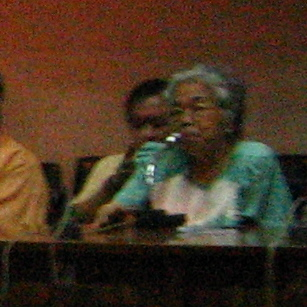
Amelia Lapeña Bonifacio

=== January ===
- January 3 – Ninez Cacho-Olivares (b. 1941), journalist (Daily Tribune)
- January 9 – Iñaki Vicente (b. 1955), football player
- January 25 – Ben Hur Villanueva (b. 1938), sculptor

=== February ===
- February 4 – Fernando Suarez (b. 1967), Roman Catholic priest
- February 5 – Delfin Castro (b. 1925), former major general of the Armed Forces of the Philippines

=== March ===
- March 21 – Aileen Baviera (b. 1959), former dean of the University of the Philippines Asian Center
- March 23 – Alan Ortiz (b. 1953), former head of the National Transmission Corporation and SMC Global Power Holdings and current president of the Philippine Council for Foreign Relations
- March 25 – Aric del Rosario (b. 1940), former basketball coach, UST Growling Tigers Men's Basketball
- March 26:
  - Ito Curata (b. 1959), fashion designer
  - Menggie Cobarrubias (b. 1951), actor
- March 30 – Arianne Caoili (b. 1986), chess player

=== April ===
- April 2 – Bernardita Catalla (b. 1958), Ambassador to Lebanon
- April 4 – Luis Eduardo Aute (b. 1944), artist
- April 5 – Jun Factoran (b. 1944), lawyer, politician, and former DENR secretary (1987–1992)
- April 7 – Domingo Villanueva (b. 1965), cyclist
- April 9 – Leila Benitez-McCollum (b. 1930), TV and radio personality
- April 13 – Vicente Magsaysay (b. 1940), former Governor of Zambales
- April 15 – Alfonso Marquez (b. 1938), former basketball player
- April 20 – Heherson Alvarez (b. 1939), politician, former Senator (1987–1998), Congressman of the 4th district of Isabela (1998–2001), and Minister of Agrarian Reform (1986–1987)
- April 27 – Ramon Jimenez Jr. (b. 1955), advertising executive and former DOT secretary (2011–2016)
- April 30 – Bong Osorio (b. 1954), media executive and communication professor

=== May ===
- May 1 – Gilbert Luis Centina III (b. 1947), Roman Catholic priest, poet and author
- May 7 – Peque Gallaga (b. 1943), film director, screenwriter and actor
- May 10 – Sonny Parsons (b. 1958), actor, singer, and member of the band Hagibis
- May 14 – Teresa Aquino-Oreta (b. 1944), former member of the Philippine House of Representatives from Lone District of Malabon-Navotas (1987–1998) and senator (1998–2004)

=== June ===
- June 8 – Oliver Ongtawco (b. 1941), bowler
- June 10 – Anita Linda (b. 1924), actress
- June 12 – Perfecto R. Yasay, Jr. (b. 1947), former secretary of DFA (2016–2017)
- June 13 – Nic Jorge (b. 1941), basketball coach
- June 15 – Lilia Dizon (b. 1928), actress
- June 16 – Danding Cojuangco (b. 1935), businessman and politician
- June 22 – Jesus Dosado (b. 1940), Roman Catholic prelate and former archbishop of Ozamis
- June 26 – Ramon Revilla Sr. (b. 1927), former senator and actor
- June 27 – Antonio Cuenco (b. 1936), former congressman (2nd District of Cebu City)

=== July ===
- July 5 – Marissa Mercado-Andaya (b. 1969), former congresswoman
- July 14 – Susan Quimpo (b. 1961), activist and author
- July 15 – Mateo A.T. Caparas (b. 1923), lawyer and politician
- July 18:
  - Jaybee Sebastian (b. 1980), convicted drug lord
  - Manuel C. Sobreviñas (b. 1924), Roman Catholic prelate and Bishop of Imus
- July 22 – Chito Soganub (b. 1972), priest and Marawi siege hostage
- July 23:
  - Tomas Joson III (b. 1948), former governor of Nueva Ecija
  - Fidel Agcaoili (b. 1944), activist, revolutionary, and peace negotiator

=== August ===
- August 1 – Resurreccion Borra (b. 1935), former COMELEC chairman (2007–2008)
- August 4 – Eddie Ilarde (b. 1934), radio and television host and former legislator
- August 8 – Alfredo Lim (b. 1929), senator (2004–2007) and mayor of Manila (1992–1998, 2007–2013)
- August 10 – Neil Ocampo (b. 1958), anchorman
- August 11 – Sixto Brillantes (b. 1939), COMELEC chairman (2011–2015)
- August 16 – Emman Nimedez (b. 1999), vlogger
- August 17 – Zara Alvarez (b. 1981), Human rights activist
- August 26 – Oscar Cruz (b. 1934), archbishop emeritus of Lingayen–Dagupan
- August 27 – Gilda Cordero-Fernando (b. 1930), writer, visual artist, fashion designer, and publisher

=== September ===
- September 4 – Lloyd Cadena (b. 1993), vlogger, radio personality, and author
- September 5 – Orlando Bauzon (b. 1944), former basketball player and coach
- September 8 – Bernardita Ramos (b. 1944), representative of the 2nd District of Sorsogon
- September 9 – Arnulfo Fuentebella (b. 1945), former Speaker of the Philippine House of Representatives and former representative of the 3rd (now 4th) District of Camarines Sur
- September 14 – Cynthia Barker (b. 1962), first Filipina mayor in England

=== October ===
- October 12 – Ameurfina Melencio-Herrera (b. 1922), Associate Justice of the Supreme Court (1979–1992)
- October 17 – Yusop Jikiri (b. 1951), chairperson of the Moro National Liberation Front (MNLF)
- October 18 – Jose Melo (b. 1932), Associate Justice of the Supreme Court (1992–2002) and former COMELEC chairman (2008–2011)
- October 30 – Madam Auring (b. 1940), fortune teller and actress

=== November ===
- November 10 – Mila del Sol (b. 1923), actress, entrepreneur, and philanthropist
- November 16 – Raul del Mar (b. 1941), representative of the 1st District of Cebu City
- November 20 – Rudy del Rosario (b. 1969), football player and coach of Kaya F.C.
- November 21 – Vangie de Jesus (b. 1951 or 1952), former coach of Philippines women's national volleyball team
- November 26 – Jamir Garcia (b. 1978), Slapshock frontman
- November 29 – April Boy Regino (b. 1961), singer and recording artist

=== December ===
- December 24 – Benhur Salimbangon, (b. 1945), former representative of the 4th District of Cebu
- December 29 – Amelia Lapeña Bonifacio (b. 1930), National Artist for Theater

== See also ==
=== Country overviews ===
- Philippines
- History of the Philippines
- History of the Philippines (1986–present)
- Outline of the Philippines
- Government of the Philippines
- Politics of the Philippines
- List of years in the Philippines
- Timeline of Philippine history

=== Related timelines for current period ===
- Timeline of the COVID-19 pandemic in the Philippines
- 2020
- 2020 in politics and government
- 2020s
