= Timeline of the COVID-19 pandemic in the Philippines =

Timeline of the COVID-19 pandemic in the Philippines may refer to:

- Timeline of the COVID-19 pandemic in the Philippines (2020)
- Timeline of the COVID-19 pandemic in the Philippines (2021)
- Timeline of the COVID-19 pandemic in the Philippines (2022)
