= Iisang Dagat =

Song by Imelda Papin, Xia Wenxin, Jhonvid Bangayan, and Yu Bin
- Released: April 23, 2020
- Studio: Chinatown TV, Guizhou Xinpai Media
- Length: 4:26
- Composer(s): Unknown
- Lyricist(s): Huang Xilian
- Archived official music video at the Wayback Machine (archived 2020-04-25)

"Iisang Dagat" (Chinese: 海的那边; transl. from its Filipino title: "One Sea") is a song produced by the Chinese Embassy in the Philippines. Officially, the song was made as a tribute to Chinese and Filipino front-liners working amidst the COVID-19 pandemic in the Philippines as well as to commemorate Chinese–Philippine relations.

The song received a significant negative feedback from Filipinos for being perceived as a Chinese government propaganda supporting the territorial claims of the People's Republic of China over the South China Sea. By November 2020, its music video posted in YouTube has received over 222,000 dislikes.

== Lyrics ==
Chinese Ambassador to the Philippines Huang Xilian wrote the lyrics for "Iisang Dagat".

== Recording ==
"Iisang Dagat" was performed by Filipina Camarines Sur Vice Governor and singer Imelda Papin, Filipino-Chinese singer Jhonvid Bangayan, Chinese diplomat Xia Wenxin and Chinese actor Yu Bin (who had a role in the 2019 Chinese television series, The Untamed). For at least Papin's part, she was approached by the Chinese embassy to perform "Iisang Dagat". The song had Chinese and Filipino lyrics.

== Music video ==
The music video for "Iisang Dagat" was jointly produced by the Chinese Embassy in the Philippines with Chinatown TV, and Guizhou Xinpai Media Company. The video was uploaded on YouTube in Chinatown TV's channel, as well as on Facebook. Universal Records Philippines was credited for being involved in the music video. However, the record label categorically stated they were not involved contrary to the credits on the music video. Universal Records, however, did mention that they were invited by Chinatown TV to help promote the song but the record label declined the offer.

Statements supportive of China from various government officials including Philippine President Rodrigo Duterte, Foreign Secretary Teodoro Locsin Jr., Health Secretary Francisco Duque were also featured in the video. It also featured Chinese medical workers coming in to help with the anti-COVID-19 efforts in the Philippines.

== Reception ==
As of July 2020, the music video of "Iisang Dagat" in YouTube has received more than 4,000 likes and at least 220,000 dislikes. Criticism of the video includes perception that the song as a propaganda supportive of the Chinese government's stance in the South China Sea disputes. Imelda Papin in response to backlash insists she is not a "traitor", says that she was not aware that the song is a "propaganda" and narrated on how she was approached by the Chinese embassy to perform a song on "unity" which serves as a tribute to cooperation of Chinese and Filipino front-liners against the COVID-19 pandemic.

Former Senior Associate Justice Antonio Carpio, who played a key role in the 2016 South China Sea arbitration decided by the Permanent Court of Arbitration, connected the title of the song to the position of the Chinese government on the South China Sea disputes. Carpio says that song title is an allusion to the South China Sea and has an implied message that China owns the South China Sea. He said that the video is part of a larger effort of China to influence public opinion to make up for its failures at the early stage of the COVID-19 pandemic. Carpio attributed the disproportionate number of dislikes of "Iisang Dagat"'s YouTube music video as evidence that the move "boomeranged" on China making Filipinos "more angry at China".

Jay Batongbacal, Director of the UP Institute for Maritime Affairs and Law of the Sea says that the video is an attempt to placate Filipino public opinion following recent diplomatic protests filed over China's continued activity to assert its territorial claims in the South China Sea taking advantage of countries' preoccupation in dealing with the COVID-19 pandemic.

"Save Our Seas", a 2019 song by Vietnamese rapper Tu P, Filipino rapper Marx Sickmind, and Malaysian singer Mei Lee which is about the South China Sea dispute as well as "Isang Bangka", a Philippine Navy institutional song by The Band gained traction following the release of "Iisang Dagat".
