= Ito Curata =

Filipino fashion designer (1959–2020)

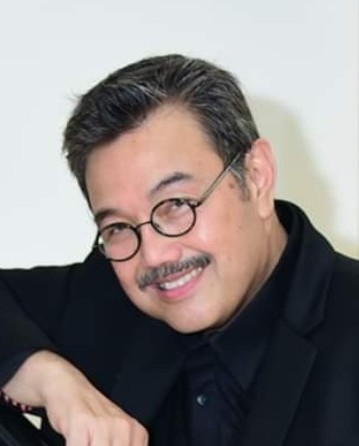
- Curata in 2019
- Born: Ito Mendoza Curata; November 2, 1959; Manila, Philippines
- Died: March 26, 2020 (aged 60); Muntinlupa, Philippines
- Resting place: Manila Memorial Park
- Other name: Encarnito Mendoza Curata
- Occupation: Fashion Designer
- Partner: Robert H. Miller
- Children: 1
- Honours: 2016 People Asia's Men Who Matter and Batangas' Outstanding Citizen

Ito Curata (2 November 1959 – 26 March 2020) was one of the Philippines top fashion designers who specialized in conceptualizing bridal gowns and Filipiniana clothing. Among his notable clients were Hollywood actress Sharon Stone, former Philippine president Gloria Macapagal Arroyo, Margarita Moran-Floirendo and Filipino actress Bea Alonzo.

== Early life and education ==
Ito Mendoza Curata was born in Manila, Philippines, on November 2, 1959, and was raised in Batangas City. Curata took up Fine Arts at the University of the Philippines for a year. He moved to the States when he was just 17 in 1977 where he got a scholarship at Clarion University of Pennsylvania but since their fine arts program was very limited, he decided to forfeit his scholarship and move to San Francisco. He then studied at the University of San Francisco where he obtained a bachelor of fine arts degree and at the Academy of Art University where he graduated from the university's Certificate program. After college, Curata decided to become a banker for a while and occasionally made gowns for some of his friends. After a couple of years working in banking, Curata decided to pursue his dreams of becoming a Fashion Designer.

== Career ==
Curata lived in San Francisco in the United States for 26 years. While in San Francisco, Curata ran his own atelier and designed clothing for high-profile public figures such as actress Sharon Stone and socialite Helena Maria Schulz. He was the first Filipino-American designer to be spotlighted by the Hollywood press. After his partner Bob retired In the early 2000s, they both decided to move back to the Philippines where Curata continued to design clothing for some of the Philippines top socialites. Former President Gloria Macapagal Arroyo, and Filipina actress and singer Bea Alonzo were among his Philippine-based clients. In 2016, he received People Asia's Men Who Matter award and in 2019, he was recognized as an Outstanding Citizen in Batangas.

At the first Miss Universe Philippines fashion show in 2019, Curata's works were among the featured in the exhibition.

Curata also occasionally judged and made gowns for Beauty Pageants.

== Death ==
He and his partner Miller were admitted to a hospital in mid-March due to COVID-19 symptoms. Curata and Miller were then admitted into the Intensive Care Unit. Curata died on March 26, 2020, due to pneumonia, a complication from COVID-19 infection, and kidney failure. Miller died two weeks after him.

== Personal life ==
Curata had a partner named Robert Miller whom he met while living in San Francisco. Miller was an executive vice president for Visa Inc. After Miller retired, they both moved the Philippines and decided to adopt a child. Curata was also known for being a great host and cook.

Curata also collected paintings and fans and displayed them in his office and on the hallways of his house. He would also collect many art and design books that he would add to his book collection in his Mini Library.
