= Timeline of the COVID-19 pandemic in the Philippines (2022) =

This article attempts to document the timeline of the COVID-19 pandemic in the Philippines in 2022.

== Timeline ==
=== January ===
- January 7 - A batch of Moderna COVID-19 vaccine (procured) consisting of 150,540 shots arrived at NAIA Terminal 1 around 10 a.m. via China Airlines, completing the delivery of 13 million-doses-agreement with the US drug maker.
- January 9 - The country received a batch of Pfizer-BioNTech COVID-19 vaccine (donated) from the US through COVAX consisting of 2,703,870 jabs which landed at NAIA Terminal 2 around 2 p.m. via a Silk Way West Airlines flight.
- January 10 - The country logged the highest number of daily COVID-19 cases with 33,169 new cases since the start of the pandemic, together with new 3,725 recovered patients and 145 deaths, propelling total cumulative cases to 2,998,530; total recoveries to 2,788,711; and death toll at 52,293.
- January 11
  - The country breached the 3 million-mark on the number of COVID-19 cases as DOH reported 28,007 new infections, climbing to 3,026,473 total with 181,016 (6%) as active cases. Meanwhile, 4,471 were logged as new recoveries and 219 were succumbed from the disease, adding to 2,792,946 recorded survivors and 52,511 as current death toll.
  - DOTr issued Department Order (DO) No. 2022-001 entitled "Limiting Public Transportation Access to Vaccinated Population in the National Capital Region under Alert Level No. 3 or higher", signed by Secretary Arthur Tugade. The said order will implement - No Vaccination, No Ride Policy starting on January 17, 2021, with exemptions on persons with medical conditions; persons who will procure essential goods and services; and essential workers.
- January 15 - The country logged yet another all-time high on the number of daily COVID-19 cases with 39,004, surging the cumulative total to 3,168,379 with 280,813 (8.9%) as active cases. Meanwhile, DOH also recorded 23,613 newly recovered patients and 43 deaths, bringing survivor count to 2,834,708 (89.5%) and death toll to 52,858 (1.67%).
- January 19
  - DOH reported first 2 fatalities linked to Omicron variant from both unvaccinated senior citizens aged over 60 years old with pre-existing medical conditions in Metro Manila and Central Luzon respectively.
  - DOH has confirmed a total of 535 COVID-19 Omicron variant cases.
- January 21 - A batch of Oxford-AstraZeneca COVID-19 vaccine (procured) for a private sector consisting of 1,877,600 doses arrived at NAIA Terminal 1 shortly before 10 a.m. via China Airlines flight CI701.
- January 24 - The FDA has certified two brands of self-supervised COVID-19 antigen test kits - Abbott Laboratories' Panbio and Labnovation Technologies' at-home antigen test.
- January 25 - DOH has detected and confirmed cases of stealth Omicron, a sub-lineage of the said variant, commonly referred as BA.2, which is also the predominant sub-lineage in most regions according on the latest genome sequencing. Meanwhile, the others sub-lineage BA.1, has been detected in 8 regions and it is now predominant in Bicol Region and returning Overseas Filipinos (ROFs).
- January 26 - A batch of Pfizer-BioNTech COVID-19 vaccine (procured) consisting of 1,023,750 shots arrived at NAIA Terminal 3 shortly before 9 p.m. via Air Hong Kong flight LD456. With this new arrival, the country has now received a total of 216,543,270 vaccine doses from various drug makers.
- January 28 - The country has breached the 3.5 million mark on the number of COVID-19 cases with a total of 3,511,491 as DOH logged another 18,638 new infections, bringing the active positive patients to 231,658 (6.6%). Meanwhile, the total recoveries reached 3,226,032 (91.9%) and death toll at 53,801 (1.53%), as new 13,106 survivors and 68 deaths were reported.

=== February ===
- February 1 - Through IATF Resolution No. 159, the country has eased its border control starting today (Feb. 1), allowing returning fully-vaccinated Filipinos regardless of place of origin to enter the country without the mandatory quarantine, requiring only a 48-hours negative RT-PCR test result before departure. Subsequently, the same resolution will be applied to all fully vaccinated foreigners from visa-free countries on February 10, 2022.
- February 2 - A batch of Pfizer-BioNTech vaccines (procured) consisting of 455,130 vials arrived at NAIA Terminal 3 at around 9 p.m. via Air Hong Kong flight LD456.
- February 4 - A batch of Pfizer-BioNTech vaccines (procured) consisting of 780,000 doses arrived at NAIA Terminal 3 at around 9:40 p.m. via an Air Hong Kong flight. National Task Force against COVID-19 revealed that this batch of vaccines is allotted for children aged 5–11.
- February 7 – The country officially started the vaccination of children aged from 5 to 11 years old against COVID-19.
- February 9 - A batch of Pfizer-BioNTech vaccines (procured) consisting of 455,130 doses arrived at NAIA Terminal 3 at around 9 p.m. via Air Hong Kong flight LD456.
- February 10
  - The second batch of reformulated Pfizer-BioNTech vaccines (procured) consisting of 780,000 vials for children aged 5–11 arrived at NAIA Terminal 3 at around 9 p.m via an Air Hong Kong flight LD456.
  - A batch of Pfizer-BioNTech vaccines (donated) from the US through COVAX consisting of 3,436,290 shots arrived at NAIA Terminal 2 at around 9 p.m. via a Silk Way Airlines flight.
  - IATF through Resolution 160-D has approved DFA's recommendation to recognize the COVID-19 vaccination certificates of 4 additional countries - Brazil, Israel, South Korea, and East Timor.
- February 14 - Philippines and Malaysia reached an agreement to mutually recognize each other's COVID-19 vaccination certificates. Inbound travelers from Malaysia are now allowed to enter the country using MySejahtera and travelers from the country are allowed to enter Malaysia using VaxCertPH.
- February 16 - The third batch of reformulated Pfizer-BioNTech COVID-19 vaccines (procured) consisting of 780,000 doses for children aged 5–11 arrived at NAIA Terminal 3 before 9 p.m. via Air Hong Kong flight LD456.
- February 17
  - A batch of Pfizer-BioNTech vaccines (procured) consisting of 455,130 doses arrived at NAIA Terminal 3 around 9 p.m. via Air Hong Kong flight LD456.
  - IATF-EID through their Resolution No. 162, approved the COVID-19 vaccination certificates of additional 15 countries and territories - Argentina, Azerbaijan, Brunei, Cambodia, Chile, Denmark, Ecuador, Indonesia, Macau, Myanmar, Papua New Guinea, Peru, Portugal, Spain and Syria.
- February 18
  - Household workers including some OFWs were denied of shelter and forced to stay outside their employer's home after testing positive, amid the fifth wave of COVID-19 in Hong Kong.
  - The country received a second batch of Pfizer-BioNTech vaccines (donated) from the Australian government in partnership with UNICEF consisting of 1,432,080 jabs which arrived at NAIA Terminal 3 at around 9 p.m. via Air Hong Kong flight LD456.
- February 20 - IATF-EID through their Resolution No. 162-B, approved vaccination certificates of additional 8 countries - Albania, Egypt, Estonia, Greece, Malta, Maldives, Palau, and Uruguay.
- February 21 - The country received a second batch of Pfizer-BioNTech vaccines (donated) from the Australian government in partnership with UNICEF consisting of 293,670 jabs which arrived at NAIA Terminal 3 at around 9:05 p.m. via Air Hong Kong flight LD456.
- February 22 - Philippine Consul General in Hong Kong Raly Tejada reported at least 61 Filipinos tested positive, amid the surge of COVID-19 in the region. Furthermore, presidential spokesperson Karlo Nograles revealed that POLO already provided cash, food packs, and hygiene kits to those infected and provided $200 financial assistance each to OFWs who recovered from COVID-19.
- February 28 - The country recorded the lowest number of COVID-19 daily cases this year with 951. DOH also logged 1,717 new recoveries and 50 fatalities. These brought the total cases to 3,661,997 with 52,179 (1.4%) as active cases, 3,553,367 (97.0%) survivors, and 56,451 (1.54%) as death toll.

=== March ===
- March 1 - The DOH announced that starting March 7, it will be shifting the daily 4 p.m. COVID-19 bulletin to a weekly bulletin released every Monday at 4 p.m.
- March 3: A batch of Pfizer BioNTech vaccine (procured) 804,000 doses for children aged 5–11 years old, arrived at NAIA Terminal 3 via DHL Express Flight LD456 at around 9 p.m.
- March 7
  - The country received the largest single-day shipment of vaccines which is a batch of Pfizer BioNTech vaccines (donated) through COVAX consisting of 3,999,060 doses, arrived at NAIA Terminal 3 morning via a Qatar Airways flight (A7-BFO).
  - In its first weekly bulletin, the DOH reported 6,297 new COVID-19 cases from March 1–7, 2022, with a daily average of 899. Meanwhile, DOH also logged 615 deaths, raising the death toll to 57,066.
- March 8 - The country reported the lowest daily cases this year with 442 new cases, pushing the total to 3,668,710 cases. Meanwhile, the DOH also logged 6 succumbed patients, pushing the total death toll to 57,072.
- March 9 - A batch of Pfizer-BioNTech COVID-19 vaccines (procured) consisting of 1,184,700 doses (128,700 for 12 years and above; and 1,056,000 doses for 5-11 children), arrived at NAIA Terminal 3 at around 9 p.m. via DHL Express flight LD456.
- March 10 - A batch of Pfizer-BioNTech COVID-19 vaccines (procured) consisting of 1,056,000 reformulated doses for children, arrived at NAIA Terminal 3 past 8 p.m. via Air Hong Kong flight LD456.
- March 11: A batch of Pfizer-BioNTech vaccine (procured) consisting of 1,080,000 doses for children aged 5–11 years old, arrived at NAIA Terminal 3 via a DHL Express Flight LD456 past 9 p.m.
- March 12: A batch of Pfizer-BioNTech vaccine (procured) consisting of 1,032,000 doses for children aged 5–11 years old, arrived at NAIA Terminal 3 via DHL Express Flight LD456 past 8 p.m.
- March 14 - A batch of Pfizer-BioNTech vaccine (procured) consisting of 868,140 doses (for teens 12 years old and above) arrived at Terminal 3 via DHL Express Flight LD456 past 9 p.m.
- March 21 – President Rodrigo Duterte signed Executive Order No. 166, adopting a recovery strategy, the Ten-Point Agenda on Economic Recovery. The order will remain effective and operational unless it "is modified or revoked."
- March 23 - A batch of reformulated Pfizer-BioNTech vaccines (procured) consisting of 942,000 (for 5–11 years old) doses which arrived at NAIA Terminal 3 at around 9 pm via DHL Express flight LD456.
- March 24 - A batch of reformulated Pfizer-BioNTech vaccines (procured) consisting of 936,000 (for 5–11 years old) doses which arrived at NAIA Terminal 3 at around 9 pm via DHL Express flight LD456.
- March 26 - A batch of reformulated Pfizer-BioNTech vaccines (procured) consisting of 1.2 million (for 5–11 years old) doses which arrived at NAIA Terminal 3 at around 9 pm via DHL Express flight LD456.

=== April ===
- April 27:
  - The Department of Health confirmed the first case of Omicron BA.2.12 subvariant in Baguio.
  - President Duterte signed Republic Act No. 11712, mandating continuous benefits to all medical workers in the country during this pandemic, as well as other future public health emergencies. The government released ₱7.9 billion for One COVID-19 Allowance.

=== June ===
- June 9 – Cebu Governor Gwendolyn Garcia, through Executive Order No. 16, lifted a rule for the mandatory use of face masks in open spaces in the province, contrary to those set by the Department of Health. While few municipalities in the province adopted the order, it later caused tensions with the Department of the Interior and Local Government. By late June, the DILG and the Cebu provincial government settled into forming guidelines regarding optional wearing of face masks in the province.
- June 18 – National Task Force Against COVID-19, citing a report from the National Vaccination Operations Center a day prior, reported that 70,005,247 people in the country had been fully vaccinated against COVID-19, representing 77.78% of the target population.
- June 28 – Department of Health announced the revision of metrics in the COVID-19 alert level system, removing the criteria regarding two-week positive growth rate. As a result, on June 29, five areas in the National Capital Region, previously classified under moderate risk classification on June 25, were reverted to low risk.

=== July ===
- July 8 - Exactly 8 days after his assumption in the Malacañang Palace, President Bongbong Marcos tested positive with COVID-19 via an antigen test as announced by press secretary Trixie Cruz-Angeles.

== See also ==
- 2022 in the Philippines
- COVID-19 vaccination in the Philippines
- Philippine government response to the COVID-19 pandemic
