= Ben Hur Villanueva =

Filipino sculptor (1938–2020)

Ben-Hur Gorospe Villanueva (October 28, 1938 – January 25, 2020) was a Filipino sculptor, painter, educator, lecturer, and art entrepreneur based in Baguio.

He has also served as a president for the Society of Philippine Sculptors (SPS), as Art director for the Ephpheta Foundation for the Blind, Inc., and as vice president-treasurer for Unesco's International Art Association (IAA).

== Notable works ==
Ben Hur Villanueva is best known as a sculptor, working with brass, metal, and wood. Notable sculptures by Villanueva include:

- Kapit-Bisig - a commemorative Narra wood sculpture of four figures locking arms, which was presented by President Corazon Aquino to the Filipino people on the first anniversary of the 1986 EDSA Revolution.
- Among Supremo - a sculpture of Andres Bonifacio in Fort Bonifacio, Taguig
- Thy Will Be Done - a sculpture at the campus of Saint Paul University Quezon City
- St. Aloysius Gonzaga - a sculpture at the campus of Saint Louis University in Baguio
- Risen Christ - a statue in Caleruega, Nasugbu, Batangas

He held regular art exhibitions around the Philippines, and also occasionally exhibited in New York, Paris, Tokyo, Singapore, Helsinki, and Havana.

== Teaching career ==
Villanueva spent 30 years teaching arts at the Ateneo de Manila Grade School in Quezon City, Philippines. In interviews he said this experience convicted him of the importance of the school motto, "Ad Majorem Dei Gloriam" (For the greater Glory of God and A Man for Others). "Every individual has his/her artistic inclinations and propensity be it visual, music, dance, literary, or fashion and so he/she has the right to enhance and utilize it creatively," he is quoted as saying. "Sharing it with others is what makes our life more meaningful and blessed."

== Retirement to Baguio and Arko ni Apo ==
Keeping these beliefs in mind, Villanueva moved to Baguio upon retiring from teaching at Ateneo in 1992. He put up an arts workshop, Arko Ni Apo (Ilocano: Ark of the Lord), and he started spearheading various art-related activities catering to people ranging from professionals, educators, students, young artists, television/film writers and directors, street children, to various religious groups.

== Death ==
He died on January 25, 2020, in Baguio, Philippines due to chronic obstructive pulmonary disease.
