= Cynthia Barker =

Filipino politician (1962–2020)

Mayor of Hertsmere
- In office 5 October 2015 – 14 September 2020

Personal details
- Born: 25 May 1962 Laguna, Philippines
- Died: 14 September 2020 (aged 58) London, England
- Party: Conservative
- Education: Adamson University

Cynthia Barker (25 May 1962 – 14 September 2020) was a Filipino-born British politician who served as mayor of Hertsmere, England until her death.

She served as town councillor for Elstree and Borehamwood and borough councillor for Potters Bar from May 2015 to May 2019. She was re-elected to Hertsmere to represent the Borehamwood Kenilworth ward in May 2019.

Barker was a trustee for Elstree and Borehamwood Museum, trustee for the Sixty Plus Club, school governor for St. Nicholas Church of England School, committee member of Elstree and Borehamwood NSPCC branch and a member of Rotary Club of Elstree and Borehamwood, all as voluntary roles.

Barker was born in Laguna, Philippines as Cynthia Alcantara. She studied Industrial Engineering in Adamson University.

== Death ==
Barker died on 14 September 2020, following "a bout of serious illness".
