= 1900 in the Philippines =

- Decades: 1880s; 1890s; 1900s; 1910s; 1920s
- See also: List of years in the Philippines

1900 in the Philippines details events of note that happened in the Philippines in the year 1900.

== Incumbents ==
President Emilio Aguinaldo c. 1898.

=== First Philippine Republic ===
- President: Emilio Aguinaldo

=== U.S. Military Government ===
- Governor:
  - Elwell Stephen Otis (until May 5)
  - Arthur MacArthur, Jr. (starting May 5)

== Ongoing events ==
- Philippine–American War

== Events ==
=== February ===
- February 2 – The Daily Bulletin (now Manila Bulletin) is established as the second oldest existing English language newspaper.

=== April ===
- April 7 – Resistance fighters led by Gen. Nicolas Capistrano launch a failed surprise attack against the U.S. troops, under Col. Edward Godwin, in Cagayan de Misamis, Mindanao;
- April 15–19 – Several Filipino nationalists attack an American garrison in Catubig, Samar; some 150 of them die while 12 of 31 volunteers in the burned barracks are later rescued.

=== May ===
- May 14 – Five hundred revolutionaries under Capt. Vicente Roa attack U.S. Capt. Walter Elliot and 80 men at the hill of barrio Agusan, Cagayan de Misamis; ending with Roa and 34 to 38 of his men killed, along with two Americans.

=== June ===
- June 4 – Revolutionary forces under Col. Apolinar Velez launch an assault on Americans in Makahambus Hill in Cagayan de Misamis, with American company under Capt. Thomas Millar retreats; a Filipino and nine Americans are killed in the Americans' first loss in the Philippine–American War.
- June 21 – Military governor Gen. MacArthur issues a proclamation providing amnesty to those who fought against the United States since the previous year, giving a 90-day period for them to swear an allegiance to the colonial government.

=== July ===
- July 1 – Gen. Artemio Ricarte and his companion are arrested by the civil guards in Manila following reports of his planned insurgency. Ricarte would be deported to Guam the following year.

=== September ===
- September 13 – Col. Maximo Abad and his 250 nationalists ambush Capt. Devereux Shields, who would later wounded, and 54 U.S. troops, in Marinduque. The latter surrenders with four casualties.
- September 17 – Troops under Gen. Juan Cailles successfully resist an assault by Col. Benjamin Cheatham and his 300 men in Mabitac, with the deaths of 21 American soldiers.

=== December ===
- December 12 – About a thousand Pulahan extremists attack the American contingent of Lt. Stephen Hayt and 38 constables during the latter's patrol through Cebu. A large number of attackers and all constables, except Hayt, are killed.

== Holidays ==
As a former colony of Spanish Empire and being a catholic country, the following were considered holidays:

- January 1 – New Year's Day
- April 12 – Maundy Thursday
- April 13 – Good Friday
- December 25 – Christmas Day

== Births ==
- November 11 – Narciso Ramos, Secretary of Foreign Affairs (d. 1986)
- Juanita Ángeles, silent film actress (d. unknown)

== Death ==
- March 10 – Delfina Herbosa de Natividad, one of the three women who seamed together the Flag of the Philippines (b. 1879)
