= Regino Díaz Relova =

Filipino revolutionary

- Born: February 29, 1874; Pila, Laguna, Captaincy General of the Philippines
- Died: August 2, 1961 (aged 87); Victoria, Laguna, Philippines

Regino Díaz Relova (August 2, 1874 – June 18, 1961) was a Filipino revolutionary who fought during the Philippine Revolution in Los Baños, Bay, Calauan and his hometown Pila, Laguna during the Philippine–American War. He was ranked as a lieutenant colonel of the Katipunan.

== Antecedents ==
Relova was born in Pila, Laguna to parents Don Feliciano Díaz Relova and Doña Concepción Díaz. Feliciano, God-fearing and industrious, was a three-term Capitan Municipal of Pila in 1875–1876, 1885–1888 and 1895–1898.

Feliciano and Concepción had nine children, namely eldest Ruperto, Paz, Socorro (who died a young maiden), Regino, Iñigo, Santiago (great grandfather of Lia Relova Price), Arcadio (great grandfather of Dominic Ochoa and Maverick Relova), Federico and José (whose son, Lorenzo Relova, became Associate Justice of the Supreme Court).

Feliciano's parents (Regino Relova's grandparents) were Don Regino Reloba de San Antonio and Doña Oliva Díaz and sisters Salomé (who married a Ruíz) and Eduvigis (who died a young maiden). Don Regino Reloba de San Antonio, who changed his surname to Relova after a decree by Spanish Governor General Narciso Clavería y Zaldúa on November 21, 1849, was Capitán Municipal of Pila in 1855–1856.

Don Regino Reloba de San Antonio's parents (Regino Relova's great grandparents) were Don Alejandro de San Antonio and Doña María Oca. Alejandro is considered to be the first Relova in Pila as he could have moved from Pasig to the present site owned by Don Felizardo de Rivera at the time of its complete transfer from Pagalangan on May 20, 1804.

== Initial involvement in the Katipunan ==
Regino Relova was already set up for life as a haciendero with the vast rice and coconut landholdings that formed the massive wealth of the Relova clan in Laguna at that time.

As the revolution broke out in August 1896, Laguna was one of the first eight provinces to rise against the Spaniards’ oppressive rule. Although Laguna had that distinction, the municipal governments and the principalia in the province were generally reluctant to fully support the revolution.

Feliciano, who felt the Filipinos were not yet ready, tried to prevent son Regino Diaz Relova from actively taking part in it. Then Feliciano brought his son to their relative Kapitan Penalosa in Lucban and were advised, after week's stay, to seek an audience with Marquéz de Solier, the Gobernador Provincial in Santa Cruz, Laguna so as not to be placed under suspicion of being Katipuneros.

The Relovas and other Pila officials went to Santa Cruz on November 23, 1896, but were immediately arrested and jailed for nine days. They were incarcerated as a certain Quisumbing from Los Baños tagged them as insurrectos who fed the revolutionaries and added that bullets were being made in the house of Juan Bartolomé.

The younger Relova's arms were tied behind his back to a long piece of bamboo that he could neither sit nor stand inside the small cell. He would, in his later years, joke about the incident, playfully singing that “hindi siya makaupo at hindi siya makatayo” to his children and grandchildren.

A Spanish official by the name of Lt. Dagoberto del Río, who was acquainted with the Relova family as he often attended Pila's parties and even courted a girl there, released them. Another account said that they were released 'at the behest of the mayors of Luisiana, Majayjay, and Lucban who claimed that the suspects were passing through their towns at the time in question in order to report to the alcalde mayor of Tayabas since Santa Cruz was then in disarray.' However, the mayor of Luisiana and his secretary, who had vouched for them, were themselves eventually arrested as traitors, imprisoned and executed by a firing squad.

== Spaniard writes about Relova ==
Relova seems to have gone back to private life after that incident. In the military journal “A Spaniard in Aguinaldo’s Army” by Telesforo Pérez Carrasco (as translated by Nick Joaquin), Carrasco wrote “...From the port of Pasacao in November 1897, I sailed for Manila with my family aboard the steamer Saturnus. We rested in Manila three days and then went aboard again, this time on one of the little steamers that daily sail to the province of Laguna. In this province I presented myself to my new captain, who, after granting me some days of rest, found it convenient to assign me to the post of Pila.

This town is located a league more or less from the capital. It is a rich town and its folk are addicted to all kinds of diversion. My predecessors at the post had been rather strict with the townspeople, not permitting dances and other frolics to last later than ten ‘o’clock at night. One day the son of the municipal captain came to quarters to see me. His name was Regino Relova. He invited me to a dance they proposed to hold that night. I excused myself from attending it. Then he said they would be infinitely grateful if I permitted the dance to last until eleven o’ clock or midnight. I told them they could dance all night if they wished to since I had no orders to the contrary on the matter. He was very pleased with my answer and he related what had been happening under my predecessors. My policy made me popular with all the unmarried young men and women in town and there was no fiesta that I did not attend.

In mid-January 1898, my relief arrived along with the communication confirming my release from the corps and my assignment to the said battalion. I took leave of all my friends and on departing from town what was my surprise to find many of these friends on horseback, ready to accompany me to the town of Santa Cruz.

We all rode to that capital and after presenting myself to the district commander and the captain of the line I stepped out to rejoin my friends. To express the gratitude and affection they professed to owe me they had ordered a succulent meal at the establishment of a Spaniard. After the meal, which, I repeat was succulent and did not lack even champagne, a moving scene unfolded. On bidding farewell to my friends, I was embraced first of all by my friend Regino, who forthwith began to cry like a child, whereupon all the others likewise burst into tears. I therefore hid them in one of the interior rooms so that none might see them.

The Spanish owner of the establishment inquired the reason for the lamentation and I replied that it was on account of my being separated from them. He said he was acquainted with the various of my friends and knew them to be distinguished persons and of fine sensibilities.

As soon as they had calmed down, I allowed them to step out but I did not even give them my hand for fear they would start wailing again and would get me crying too-as had happened before! Never can I forget the town of Pila and my beloved friends there!"

In May 1898, Carrasco eventually surrendered and also served under the Philippine Revolutionary Army and, while campaigning in the North, met General Manuel Tinio, whose nephew Juan Tinio Hernández (son of Catalina Tinio and Clemente Hernández) would eventually marry one of Regino Díaz Relova’s daughters, Socorro Bartolome Relova, before World War II.

== The Philippine–American War ==
General Juan Cailles commissioned Relova as lieutenant colonel in the Philippine Revolutionary Army after the former succeeded General Paciano Rizal as Laguna’s overall commander at the height of incisive attacks by American forces in July 1900.

Cailles’ six military columns included the third column commanded by Relova that covers Pila, Bay, Calauan and Los Baños; General Severino Taino in San Pedro, Biñan, Santa Rosa, Cabuyao and Calamba; Lt. Canuto Aritao in Lumbang, Longos, San Antonio, Paete, Pakil and Pangil; Major Roman Dimayuga/Lt. Col. Pedro Caballes in Santa Cruz, Pagsanjan, Cavinti, Luisiana and Majayjay, Col. Julio Infante in Magdalena, Liliw, Rizal, Nagcarlan and San Pablo; and Lt. Col. Fidel Ángeles (who died in the Battle of Mabitac) in Siniloan, Mabitac and Santa Maria.

Relova had just married Teodula Oca Bartolomé, daughter of Juan Bartolomé, on February 26, 1900, or just four months before he headed Laguna's third column.

The Philippine Insurgent Records, particularly the Cailles papers, detailed the activities of the Laguna revolutionaries, including those of Relova. As he persuaded Relova to reconsider his leave of absence on September 20, 1900, Cailles said the Pila-born officer is “one of the strong arms in defending sacred interests—believes him a worthy patriot and citizen animated by love of country, incapable of abandoning its people to desolation and misfortune.” This was possibly the most glowing tribute that the general ever made to any of this subordinates.

After General Emilio Aguinaldo ordered the shift from conventional to guerrilla warfare on November 13, 1899, the Cailles forces conducted ambuscades, sabotage and other activities against the Americans.

On September 27, 1900, Cailles ordered Relova to arrange troops and make an attack on a convoy that frequently goes from Santa Cruz to Pila and retreat to Buhanginan.

On October 6, 1900, Cailles ordered the Relova's third column along with the second and fourth column to prepare for a general attack but “not to disregard any occasion for surprising the enemy’s convoys or unprotected positions.”

On December 26, 1900, Relova and two other chiefs of column were again ordered to “attack unprotected points and convoy of enemy crossing the territory—counting from the first day of the coming year—no garrisons to be attacked, so as not to waste ammunition—new century to be saluted by the said attacks—expects brilliant results—movements of columns to be continuous under new order.” Cailles also gave all his subordinates the power to summarily kill for treason.

As the war wore on, the Filipino revolutionaries were faced with the growing influence of Americans in many Laguna towns.

In February 1901, Cailles transferred the towns of Los Banos and Bay from Col. Julio Herrera to Relova's command after an “anomalous condition’ of the city governments in these areas, including Alaminos that led him to believe that these have fallen to the invaders’ hands.

On April 4, 1901, Cailles told Relova that “Prudence and clemency cannot be extended to those who far from withdrawing from the enemy, remain at their side, assisting them by any means in their work, for which reason, you in use of powers conferred upon you concerning political order, can direct the capture and delivery before me of the acting priest of that town and of the citizen,_____________, being traitors, citizens fatal to the country, unless they respond to a friendly call which you will make them, in order that they may return to the ground of legality.” .

Following the capture of General Emilio Aguinaldo in Palanan, Isabela on March 23, 1901, the cracks in the revolutionary movement became even more pronounced. Laguna revolutionaries had to contend with the realities of war like declining resources amid pressures from the American side.

Relova surrendered sometime April 1901 as mentioned in Cailles’ communications to Majors Faustino Pantua, Cecilio Queriosa and Manuel Quiogue on April 4, 1901. In his later years, Relova related to grandson Regino Relova Hernandez that he surrendered after the Americans arrested and allegedly threatened to kill wife Teodula Bartolome Relova and first-born son Delfín. The Philippine Insurgent Records (625.3) mentioned a complaint lodged against one Major Pitcher of the 8th Infantry regarding the means used in securing Relova's surrender, but the actual complaint and the report of inspecting officer Lt. Col. Huggins of the 32nd Cavalry could no longer be found.

A report by General Arthur McArthur to US War Department in 1901 stated that on April 14, Relova's brother Santiago Relova and brother-in-law Ramon Diunaculandan (Dimaculangan), insurrecto vice-presidente of Pila, also surrendered.

That same month on April 13, Col. Julio Herrera surrendered to the Americans. With two of his ablest lieutenants falling to the enemy in succession, General Cailles already saw the writing on the wall. Two months after, he gave up with 400 troops and 28 officers to the Americans in Sta. Cruz, Laguna on June 24, 1901.

== Relova after the war ==
Following the Philippine–American War, Relova was needed anew to fight another war, this time the cholera outbreak in 1902–1904. He was put in charge of two barrios in his native Pila. "All dealings with people such as explaining health measures, reporting cases, and arranging burials were made through men like him."(Ileto in Arnold, 1988)

Unlike General Cailles who became governor of Laguna, Relova spent his time managing his large rice and coconut holdings in Pila and nearby Victoria, Laguna (which was separated from Pila in 1946) as his brother Arcadio took the political reins for the clan. Andres de la Cruz, who was farmer of the year in 1968, said Relova was a highly disciplined person, well-respected by the tenants of his various farms and had palabra de honor (word of honor).

Except for Delfín, most of his children were born after the Philippine–American War. They are Rosario "Charing" Bartolomé-Relova (1903) Loreto “Etong” Bartolomé Relova (1907); Socorro "Coring" Bartolomé-Relova (1911); Federico "Pito" Bartolomé Relova (1914); Regino Manuel "Meneng" Ernesto Bartolomé-Relova, Jr. (1916); and Gonzalo "Celeng" Bartolomé-Relova (1922).

Regino, according to grandson Regino Relova Hernández, spoke fluent Spanish although not much is known about his schooling. He also added that Relova's favorite food were tinolang manok, puchero, sinigang na baboy and sinabawang kibal.

Relova became blind in his later years due to a horseriding accident in Barangay San Francisco in Victoria, Laguna, where his farm was located. To exercise, he and a companion would walk from his house in Pila to Balite (in Victoria) and take the LTB bus back home. Although blind, he often climbed the attic of his house where he kept all sorts of things. He died of natural causes at the age of 86 on June 18, 1961, after his wife Teodula and daughter Socorro died on February 18, 1960, and October 11, 1960, respectively.

== Other prominent Relovas ==
- Lorenzo “Inching” Rivera Relova (Associate Justice of the Supreme Court)
- Loreto Bartolome Relova, Miss Laguna and entry for the Miss Philippines search of the 1926 Manila Carnival
- Querubin Agra Relova, longest running Pila town executive (17 years)
- Jose Dominic Ochoa (TV and movie personality)
- Anthony “Maverick” Relova (TV and radio personality)
- Lia Relova Price, book author
- Cora Relova, Pila heritage advocate
- Rogelio Relova, first Pila graduate from University of the Philippines (UP) College of Medicine (1931)
- Benjamin Rivera Relova, first graduate of UP Law in 1936 ( with Luis O. Rivera)
- Carmencita Relova Rivera, first woman doctor from Pila who graduated from the UP College of Medicine in 1948.
- Regino Bartolome Relova, Jr., who graduated from Mapua in 1940, was the first mechanical engineer from Pila
- Mark Laurence Relova, who graduated from University of the Philippines Diliman (UPD) in 2002, and is currently an Executive Director.
