= 1897 in the Philippines =

- Decades: 1870s; 1880s; 1890s; 1900s; 1910s
- See also: List of years in the Philippines

This is a list of notable events that happened in the Philippines in the year 1897.

== Incumbents ==
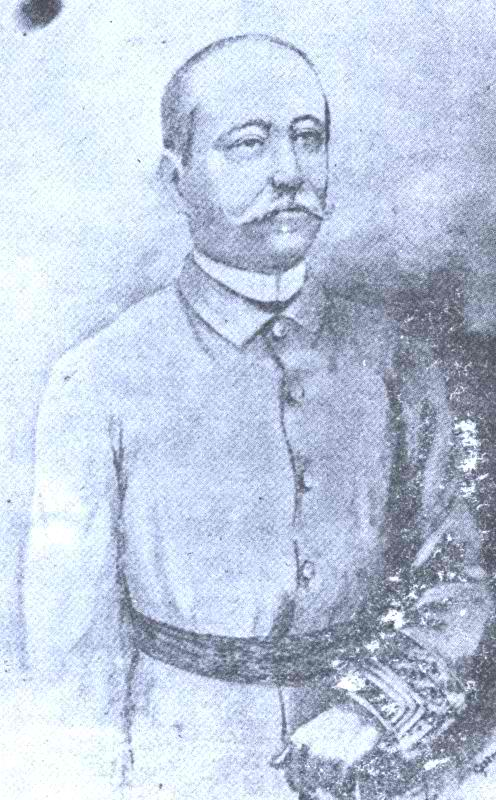
Camilo Polavieja y del Castillo, Marqués de Polavieja.

=== Spanish Colonial Government ===
- Governor-General:
  - Camilo de Polavieja (until April 15)
  - José de Lachambre (April 15 – 23)
  - Fernándo Primo de Rivera (starting April 23)

=== Philippine Revolutionary Government (Tejeros Government) ===
- Vice President:
  - Mariano Trías (March 22 – November 2)
- Captain General: Artemio Ricarte

=== Republic of Biak-na-Bato ===
- Vice President:
  - Mariano Trías (starting March 22)

== Events ==
=== January ===
- January 4 – Eleven of the fifteen Filipinos who would later be called the Fifteen Martyrs of Bicol are executed in Bagumbayan.
- January 11 – Thirteen Filipinos who would later be called the Thirteen Martyrs of Bagumbayan are executed.

=== February ===
- February 6:
  - Ten Katipunan members convicted of subversion are executed in Bagumbayan, Manila.
  - A revolt in parts of Negros Oriental led by native priests ends in a battle with the defeat of the natives by the Spanish forces.
- February 13 – Governor-General Camilo de Polavieja begins his campaign with 16,000 Spanish soldiers to regain Cavite from Filipino revolutionaries.
- February 17 – Filipino forces win in the Battle of Zapote Bridge at the boundary of Las Piñas and Cavite.
- February 19 – Spaniards recapture Silang, Cavite in a battle.
- February 25 – Spaniards recapture Dasmariñas, Cavite in a battle.

=== March ===
- March 22 – The two factions of the Katipunan convene at the Tejeros Convention to resolve the leadership status in the organization.
- March 23 – Nineteen Filipinos who would later be called the Nineteen Martyrs of Aklan are executed in Kalibo.

=== May ===
- May 10 – Andrés Bonifacio and his brother Procopio Bonifacio are killed in Maragondon, Cavite.

=== November ===
- November 1 – The Republic of Biak-na-Bato is established by Emilio Aguinaldo and his fellow revolutionaries, marking the first republic in the Philippines.

=== December ===
- December 14 – The Pact of Biak-na-Bato is signed between Governor-General Fernando Primo de Rivera and Emilio Aguinaldo, aiming to end the Philippine Revolution.

== Holidays ==
As a colony of the Spanish Empire and being predominantly Catholic, the following were considered holidays:

- January 1 – New Year's Day
- April 15 – Maundy Thursday
- April 16 – Good Friday
- December 25 – Christmas Day

== Births ==
- January 23 – Ildefonso Santos, Filipino poet, sculptor, and writer (d. 1984)
- March 3 – José Romero, Filipino politician (d. 1978)
- June 29 – George J. Willmann, naturalized Filipino missionary from the United States (d. 1977)
- September 11 – Francisca Susano, Filipino supercentenarian (d. 2021)
- December 3 – Elisa Ochoa, first Filipina in the Congress of the Philippines (d. 1978)

== Deaths ==
- January 4 – Eleven of the Fifteen Martyrs of Bicol are executed.
- January 11 – The Thirteen Martyrs of Bagumbayan are executed.
  - José Dizon, one of the founders of Katipunan
- February 6 – Members of the Katipunan are executed:
  - Román Basa (b. 1848)
  - Teodoro Plata (b. 1866)
  - Vicente Molina
  - Hermenegildo de los Reyes
  - José Trinidad
  - Pedro Nicodemus
  - Feliciano del Rosario
  - Gervasio Samson
  - Doroteo Dominguez
  - Apolonio de la Cruz
- February 17 – Edilberto Evangelista, Filipino civil engineer and general (b. 1862)
- March 23 – The Nineteen Martyrs of Aklan are executed.
- May 10 – Andrés Bonifacio, Filipino nationalist and revolutionary; one of the founders of Katipunan (b. 1863)

=== Unknown dates ===
- Those executed after January 11, 1897:
  - Hugo Perez
  - Pedro Joson
  - Marcello de los Santos Esguerra
  - Eugenio de los Reyes y Herrera
  - Valentin Matias Lagasca y Cruz
