= 1895 in the Philippines =

- Decades: 1870s; 1880s; 1890s; 1900s; 1910s
- See also: List of years in the Philippines

1895 in the Philippines details events of note that happened in the Philippines in the year 1895.

== Incumbents ==
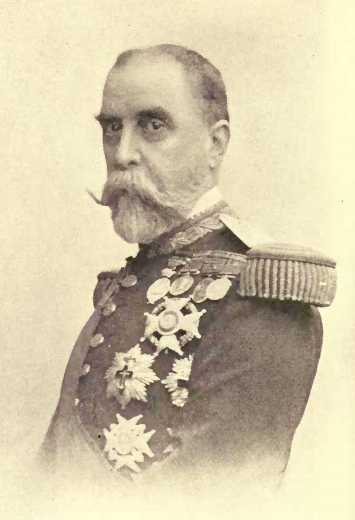
Ramón Blanco y Erenas.

- Governor-General: Ramón Blanco y Erenas

== Events ==
- January 1 – First ever local elections were held as per the Maura Law passed in 1893.
- January 15 – The first issue of the Boletin del Museo-Biblioteca de Filipinas (Bulletin of the Museum-Library of the Philippines) is published.
- January 23 – Philippine Regional Exposition was held in Manila, wherein Governor-General Blanco declares a great future predestined for the Philippines.

== Holidays ==
As a colony of Spanish Empire and being a catholic colony, the following were considered holidays:

- January 1 – New Year's Day
- April 11 – Maundy Thursday
- April 12 – Good Friday
- December 25 – Christmas Day

== Births ==
- January 13 – Vivencio Cuyugan, Filipino boxer and politician (d. 1971)
- March 23 – Encarnacion Alzona, Filipino historian and educator (d. 2001)
- December 13 – Victorio Edades, Filipino painter (d. 1985)

== Death ==
- March 10 – Amai Pakpak, Maranao leader
