= 1898 in the Philippines =

- Decades: 1870s; 1880s; 1890s; 1900s; 1910s
- See also: List of years in the Philippines

1898 in the Philippines details events of note that happened in the Philippines in the year 1898.

== Incumbents ==
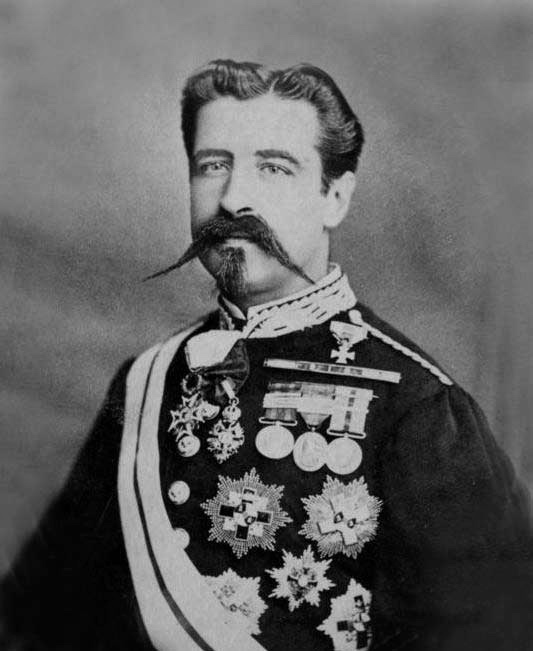
Basilio Augustín y Dávila.

=== Spanish Colonial Government ===
- Governor-General:
  - Fernando Primo de Rivera (until April 11)
  - Basilio Augustín (April 11 – July 24)
  - Fermín Jáudenes (July 24 – August 13)
  - Francisco Rizzo (acting) (August–September)
  - Diego de los Ríos (September–December 10)

=== U.S. Military Government ===
- Military Governor:
  - Wesley Merritt (August 14–28)
  - Elwell Stephen Otis (starting August 28)

=== Philippine Revolutionary Government ===
- President of the Assembly of Representatives: Pedro A. Paterno
- Vice President of the Assembly of Representatives: Gregorio S. Araneta

== Ongoing events ==
- Spanish–American War

== Events ==
=== February ===
- February 8 – The Katipunan is revived by Emilio Jacinto and Feliciano Jocson.

=== March ===
- March 15 – After two months of production, Ang Kalayaan gets published, bearing a false masthead stating that the printing was done in Yokohama when it was in fact done in Lavezares Street, Binondo, Manila. Marcelo H. del Pilar was stated as the editor, but it was Emilio Jacinto who made the final changes before printing, writing under a penname. Dimas-Ilaw, Aguedo del Rosario, and Apolinario de la Cruz subsidised types free of charge but the publisher, Pio Valenzuela, had to secure more, paying a peso for each type sold by four workforces of the Diario de Manila who stole them from the paper's production press.
- March 25 – A revolutionary government in Candon, Ilocos Sur is established by Don Isabelo Abaya as he starts Cry of Candon.

=== April ===
- April 3 – Pantaleon Villegas known as Leon Kilat leads a battle against Spanish forces in present-day Cebu City which signals the start of the revolution in Cebu province.
- April 11 – Basilio Augustín is appointed as Governor-General.
- April 17 – Local Katipunan members under Ildefonso Moreno conduct an uprising against Spanish colonizers in Daet town.
- April 18 – More inspections involving Manila residents accused of suspected accomplices in plans to oust the Spanish government were conducted by the Spanish authorities, resulting into the arrests of Jose Albert, Salvador Vivencio del Rosario, and others.
- April 21 – More suspects were arrested by the Spanish authorities: Doroteo Jose; Cecilio Velarde, the parish priest of Quiapo; Felix Roxas; Padre Consunji; and many more.

=== May ===
- May 1 - The American Asiatic Squadron under Commodore George Dewey engaged and destroyed the Spanish Pacific Squadron under Admiral Patricio Montojo y Pasarón at the Battle of Manila Bay, resulting to one American dead (an engineer who had heatstroke at the height of the battle) and 77 Spanish dead.
- May 3 – The Ugong conferees are rowed upstream in 17 bancas to a part of the Pasig River known as Bitukang Manok. They are welcomed by Valentin Cruz, president of the Sangguinang Bayan of the Katipunan in Pasig. In this big gathering, called Asemblea Magna, Dr. Pio Valenzuela is chosen to see Rizal in Dapitan.
- May 15 – Andres Bonifacio and a few katipuneros meet with the captain of the Japanese cruiser, Kongo, visiting Manila, and the Japanese consul in Manila in a room above the Japanese bazaar on Plaza Moraga, to discuss the possible purchase of Japanese arms and to request Japanese arms and to request Japan's aid to their cause. A Christian Japanese, Jose Moritario Tagawa, married to a Filipina from Bocaue, Bulacan and a friend of Dr. Pio Valenzuela, acts as interpreter.
- May 28 – The modern Flag of the Philippines was first carried after Filipino victory at the Battle of Alapan.

=== June ===
- June 12 – Philippine Declaration of Independence is held at the ancestral home of Emilio Aguinaldo, proclaiming the sovereignty of the Philippines.
- June 23 – September 10 – Elections for the Malolos Congress, also known as the Revolutionary Congress, is held. There were 68 elected representatives.

=== July ===
- July 1 – Filipino revolutionaries began the Siege of Baler in part of the offensive against Spanish troops.

=== August ===
- August 13 – The Mock Battle of Manila, a prearranged battle to satisfy the Spanish code of honor, was fought between American and Spanish troops. American victory ended the Spanish–American War.

=== October ===
- October 11 – The Manila Times is established as the post-republic and the oldest existing English language newspaper.

== Holidays ==
As a colony of Spanish Empire and being a catholic, the following were considered holidays:

- January 1 – New Year's Day
- April 7 – Maundy Thursday
- April 8 – Good Friday
- December 25 – Christmas Day

== Births ==
- January 14 – Carlos Romulo, Filipino diplomat, politician and soldier (d. 1985)
- May 5 – José Ozámiz, Filipino politician (d. 1944)
- June 26 – Pablo Amorsolo, Filipino painter (d. 1945)
- August 10 – Lorenzo Tañada, Filipino politician (d. 1992)
- September 20 – Josefa Llanes Escoda, Founder of the Girl Scouts of the Philippines (d. 1945)
- November 4 — Hilario Moncado, Founder of the Filipino Crusaders World Army (d. 1956)

== Death ==
- April 8 – León Kilat, Filipino revolutionary leader (b. 1873)

== See also ==
- List of years in the Philippines
- Timeline of Philippine History
