= 1892 in the Philippines =

- Decades: 1870s; 1880s; 1890s; 1900s; 1910s
- See also: List of years in the Philippines

1892 in the Philippines details events of note that happened in the Philippines in the year 1892.

== Incumbents ==
- Governor-General: Eulogio Despujol, 1st Count of Caspe

== Events ==
=== May ===
- May 5 – A fire ravages the Tiambeng family home in Orion, Bataan, destroying many of Francisco Balagtas' original manuscripts.

=== June ===
- June 26 – José Rizal arrives in the Philippines from Europe via Hong Kong.

=== July ===
- July 3 – Rizal forms the La Liga Filipina.
- July 6 – Rizal is arrested for establishing the La Liga Filipina.
- July 7 – Andres Bonifacio secretly established the Katipunan.
- July 17 – Rizal is exiled to Dapitan.

=== September ===
- September 22 – In Paris, Filipino painter Juan Luna fatally shot his wife Paz Pardo de Tavera, who died 11 days later.

== Death ==
- October 3 – Paz Pardo de Tavera
