= 1899 in the Philippines =

- Decades: 1870s; 1880s; 1890s; 1900s; 1910s
- See also: List of years in the Philippines

The following lists events that happened during 1899 in the Philippine Republic.

== Incumbents ==
President Emilio Aguinaldo c. 1898.

=== First Philippine Republic ===
- President: Emilio Aguinaldo (starting January 23)
- Prime Minister:
  - Apolinario Mabini (January 23 – May 7)
  - Pedro A. Paterno (May 7 – November 13)
- President of the Assembly of Representatives: Pedro A. Paterno

=== U.S. Military Government ===
- Governor: Elwell Stephen Otis

== Ongoing events ==
- Philippine–American War (started on February 4)

== Events ==
=== January ===
- January 4 – U.S. President William McKinley's declaration of December 21, 1898, proclaiming a policy of benevolent assimilation of the Philippines as a United States territory, is announced in Manila by the U.S. commander, General Elwell Otis, angering independence activists who had fought against Spanish rule.
- January 16 – Eduardo Calceta is appointed as Chief of the Army (Jefe General) of the rebel Philippine Republic army by Emilio Aguinaldo.
- January 23 – Malolos Constitution is proclaimed in Malolos, Bulacan, establishing the First Philippine Republic. Emilio Aguinaldo inaugurated as President of the Republic.

=== February ===
- February 4–5 – 12,000 American troops advanced through 2 miles of Filipino front at the Battle of Manila. It was the first and largest battle of the Philippine–American War, resulting to 60 American dead and 2,000 Filipino dead.
- February 10 – A brigade of American soldiers attacked Filipino troops after 3 hours of artillery bombardment at the Battle of Caloocan. The capture of Caloocan left American forces in control of the southern terminus of the Manila to Dagupan railway, along with five engines, fifty passenger coaches, and a hundred freight cars.

=== March ===
- March 7 – The Provisional Law on the Judiciary is issued to provide for the selection of a Chief Justice.
- March 27 – American troops marched through Marilao River while being fired upon by Filipino troops on the opposite bank.
- March 29 – The First Philippine Republic relocates its capital from Malolos to San Isidro, Nueva Ecija as the government flees an invasion of U.S. forces.
- March 31 – Malolos, the erstwhile capital of the Republic, fell to advancing American soldiers.

=== April ===
- April 9–10 – American troops fought the Battle of Santa Cruz as part of their Laguna de Bay campaign.
- April 23 – The Battle of Quingua was fought between Filipino troops led by General Gregorio del Pilar and American troops under Major J. Franklin Bell. There was a short Filipino victory until reinforcements sealed eventual American victory.
- April 30 – The U.S. establishes a protectorate over the Republic of Negros, a semi-independent government for Negros Island, separate from the rest of the Philippine Islands. The Republic exists until its annexation to the rest of the U.S. territory on April 20, 1901.

=== May ===
- May 6 – Local elections were held for provincial and municipal posts throughout the Philippine Archipelago under the American occupation.
- May 7 – The capital of the First Philippine Republic is moved by President Emilio Aguinaldo from Malolos to Angeles City
- May 11 – The country adopts PHT as its standard time at exactly 12:00 a.m., prior to the adoption, each location in the country observed its own solar mean time.
- May 16 – The last Spaniards remaining in the Philippine Islands, after the cession to the U.S., depart from the island of Basilan.
- May 17 – U.S. Army troops capture the city of San Isidro, Nueva Ecija, where President Emilio Aguinaldo had moved his capital, but find that the insurgents have already left.
- May 19 – The U.S. Army captures Tawi-Tawi, the southernmost island in the Philippines.
- May 23 – Major General Henry Ware Lawton and his troops arrive in Malolos, capital of the First Philippine Republic, after a 120-mile march in 20 days that captured 28 towns with a loss of only six men.
- May 28 – General Vicente Álvarez forms the short-lived Republic of Zamboanga on a peninsula on the island of Mindanao. The nation exists until 1903 when it is consolidated by the U.S. to the rest of the Philippine territory.
- May 29 – The Spanish system of courts, closed since the American occupation began, is revived under U.S. sovereignty and regulation.

=== June ===
- June 5 – General Antonio Luna is assassinated in Cabanatuan, Nueva Ecija.
- June 6 – The U.S. military government of the Philippines directs that the 1885 Alien Contract Labor Law, which prohibits the importation of foreign workers into the United States, be applied to bringing persons other than Americans into the Philippines.
- June 13 – 3,000 American soldiers were confronted by 5,000 Filipino soldiers in the second largest battle of the Philippine–American War, the Battle of Zapote River. American victory gave respect to General Henry Ware Lawton.

=== July ===
- July 15 – General Emilio Aguinaldo assumed civil authority in areas captured from Spanish colonial control by forces of his declared revolutionary government.

=== October ===
- October 1 – Felipe Agoncillo, dispatched by the Philippine Revolutionary government to lobby for independence, meets U.S. President McKinley, in Washington and his attempt to be part of peace talks between the United States and Spain is rejected.
- October 23 – The Philippine Independent Church is formed at a conference in Paniqui, to separate from the Roman Catholic Church.

=== November ===
- November 13 – President Aguinaldo, after a conference in Bayambang, Pangasinan, declared guerrilla warfare in the continued Filipino struggle against American occupation.

=== December ===
- December 2 – A 60-man rear guard action led by General Gregorio del Pilar fought 500 American troops who were pursuing President Aguinaldo in his flight to land's end.
- December 11 – Filipino General Tierona surrenders the province of Cagayan to U.S. Navy Captain McCalla of the USS Newark.

== Holidays ==
As a former colony of Spanish Empire and being a catholic country, the following were considered holidays:

- January 1 – New Year's Day
- March 30 – Maundy Thursday
- March 31 – Good Friday
- December 25 – Christmas Day

== Deaths ==
- February 4 – José Torres Bugallón, Filipino military officer (b. 1873)
- June 5 – Antonio Luna, Filipino pharmacist and general (b. 1866)
- December 2 – Gregorio del Pilar, Filipino general (b. 1875)
