= 1901 in the Philippines =

- Decades: 1880s; 1890s; 1900s; 1910s; 1920s
- See also: List of years in the Philippines

1901 in the Philippines details events of note that happened in the Philippines in 1901

== Incumbents ==
=== First Philippine Republic ===
President Emilio Aguinaldo

- President: Emilio Aguinaldo (until March 23)

=== U.S. Military Government ===
- Governor:
  - Arthur MacArthur, Jr. (until July)
  - Adna Chaffee, Jr. (starting July)

== Ongoing events ==
- Philippine–American War

== Events ==
=== March ===
- March 2 – The Army Appropriation Act, also known as the Spooner Amendment, is passed by the US Senate.
- March 12 – The province of Tayabas is founded.
- March 16 – The province of Romblon is founded.
- March 18 – The province of Masbate is founded.
- March 23 – General Emilio Aguinaldo is captured in Palanan, Isabela by US authorities.

=== April ===
- April 1 – Aguinaldo takes an oath of allegiance to the US.

=== June ===
- June 17 – El Colegio de San Beda established.

=== July ===
- July 4
  - Adna Chaffee appointed as the last US Military Governor (1901–1902).
  - A civil government is established in the Philippines with William Howard Taft as the first Civil Governor (1901–1904).
- July 18 – The US organizes the Philippine Constabulary.
- July 31 – US Philippine Commission Act 183 is enacted, incorporating Manila as the country's first city; it would take effect on August 7.

=== August ===
- August 28 – Silliman Institute, later known as Silliman University, is established as the first American university in the Philippines

=== September ===
- September 27 – Guerillas, headed by the Filipino Captain Daza, attack the US military barracks in Balangiga, Samar
- September 28 – Balangiga massacre occurs

=== October ===
- October 20 – A U.S. Marine battalion arrives on Samar to conduct the March across Samar operation
- November 4 – The Philippine Commission enacts the Sedition Law
- December 14 – An earthquake estimated of magnitude 7.8 shakes Lucena, Tayabas (now Quezon province when re-established in 1946).

=== Unknown date ===
- September – The first Filipino members of the second Philippine Commission are appointed

== Holidays ==
As a former colony of Spanish Empire and being a catholic country, the following were considered holidays:

- January 1 – New Year's Day
- April 4 – Maundy Thursday
- April 5 – Good Friday
- December 25 – Christmas Day
