= 1902 in the Philippines =

- Decades: 1880s; 1890s; 1900s; 1910s; 1920s
- See also: List of years in the Philippines

1902 in the Philippines details events of note that happened in the Philippines in 1902.

== Incumbents ==
=== U.S. Military Government ===
- Governor–General:
  - William Howard Taft

== Ongoing events ==
- Philippine–American War (ended July 4)
- Moro Rebellion (started on May 3)

== Events ==
=== July ===
- July 1
  - Philippine Organic Act enacted into law.

== Holidays ==
As a former colony of Spanish Empire and being a catholic country, the following were considered holidays:

- January 1 – New Year's Day
- April 4 – Maundy Thursday
- April 5 – Good Friday
- December 25 – Christmas Day

== Births ==
- January 25 – Pablo Antonio, modernist architect (d. 1975)
- August 19 – J. B. L. Reyes, jurist (d. 1994)
- November 27 – Marcial Lichauco, lawyer and diplomat (d. 1971)
