= 1896 in the Philippines =

- Decades: 1870s; 1880s; 1890s; 1900s; 1910s
- See also: List of years in the Philippines

1896 in the Philippines details events of note that happened in the Philippines in the year 1896.

== Incumbents ==
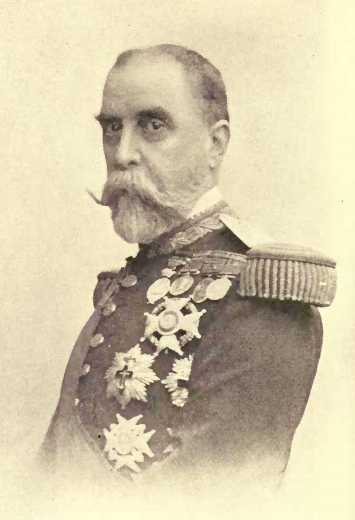
Ramón Blanco y Erenas.

- Governor-General:
  - Ramón Blanco y Erenas (until December 13)
  - Camilo de Polavieja (starting December 13)

== Events ==
=== August ===
- August 23 – Andres Bonifacio, along with his Katipuneros (Filipino revolutionaries), tear up their cedulas (personal identity documents) at the event known as the "Cry of Pugad Lawin".
- August 25 – The revolutionaries are attacked by a unit of the Spanish Guardia Civil.
- August 30 – Around 800 revolutionaries led by Bonifacio and Emilio Jacinto attack San Juan del Monte and achieve a brief victory until Spanish reinforcements arrive and disperse the rebels. Upon learning of the battle, Governor-General Ramón Blanco y Erenas places eight provinces under martial law. Sancho Valenzuela is the most notable of the revolutionaries who are imprisoned and later released.
- August 31 – Six Katipunan members are executed in Bagumbayan.

=== September ===
- September 4 – Four Katipunan members are executed in Bagumbayan.
- September 12 – Thirteen Filipinos, the Thirteen Martyrs of Cavite, are executed.

=== October ===
- October 31 – Fifty-two suspected rebels imprisoned in Fort Santiago die by asphyxia.

=== November ===
- November 9-11 – Governor-General Ramón Blanco y Erenas with more than 6,000 soldiers attacked the revolutionaries under Emilio Aguinaldo, resulting to the simultaneous Battle of Binakayan and Battle of Dalahican. It was the first major Filipino victory during the Philippine Revolution.

=== December ===
- December 30 – Jose Rizal is executed in Bagumbayan (now Rizal Park)

== Holidays ==
As a colony of Spanish Empire and being a catholic colony, the following were considered holidays:

- January 1 – New Year's Day
- April 2 – Maundy Thursday
- April 3 – Good Friday
- December 25 – Christmas Day

== Births ==
- July 3 – Jose Cojuangco, former Representative of the First District of Tarlac (d. 1976)
- October 7 – Paulino Alcántara, international footballer (d. 1964)

== Deaths ==
- September 4 – Executed members of the Katipunan:
  - Eugenio Silvestre
  - Modesto Sarmiento
  - Ramon Peralta
- September 12 – Thirteen Martyrs of Cavite (executed) including the architect and businessman Máximo Inocencio (born 1833)
- November 3 – Honorato Onrubia y Herrera, executed Katipunan member.
- December 14 – Executed Filipinos in Tarlac:
  - Procopio Hilario
  - Francisco Teñedo
- December 29 – Rosalio Silos, musician and Katipunan member (executed)
- December 30 - José Rizal, author and poet, national hero of the Philippines (b. 1861)

=== Unknown dates ===
- Rebels executed at Nueva Ecija:
  - Marcus Ventus
  - Mamerto Natividad Sr.
  - Domingo Cecilio
  - Ciriaco Sarile
  - Teodorico Lagonera
  - Quintin Tinio
- Leon Hernandez, executed at Ambos Camarines
- Lauro Dimayuga, executed at Batangas
