= Juan Cailles =

Filipino general and educator (1871-1951)

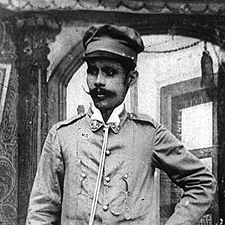

1st Governor of Laguna
- In office 1945–1945
- Preceded by: Marcelo Zorilla
- Succeeded by: Augusto de Castro
- In office 1932–1938
- Preceded by: Tomas Dizon
- Succeeded by: Arsenio Bonifacio
- In office 1916–1925
- Preceded by: Marcos Paulino
- Succeeded by: Feliciano Gomez
- In office 1902–1910
- Preceded by: Himself
- Succeeded by: Potenciano Malvar
- In office 1899–1901
- Appointed by: Emilio Aguinaldo
- Preceded by: Office established
- Succeeded by: Himself

Member of the House of Representatives from Mountain Province's at-large district
- In office October 1925 – June 2, 1931
- Appointed by: Leonard Wood (1925); Henry L. Stimson (1928)
- Preceded by: Miguel Cornejo
- Succeeded by: Juan Gaerlan

Personal details
- Born: Juan Cailles y Kauppama; November 10, 1871 Nasugbu, Batangas, Captaincy General of the Philippines
- Died: June 28, 1951 (aged 79) Ermita, Manila, Philippines
- Resting place: Libingan ng mga Bayani
- Party: Democratic Alliance (1945)
- Other political affiliations: Nacionalista (1935–1945); National Socialist (1935–1936); Democrata (1917–1935); Progresista (1907–1917); Federalista (1900–1907); Independent (1899–1900)
- Spouse: Emilia Trinidad Prudente
- Domestic partners: 1. Jacinta Vallejo Zaera; 2. Pelagia Vallejo; 3. María Ballesteros; 4. Zosima Mariano; 5. Paz Pagkatipunan; 6. Cornelia Manongsong; 7. María Consolacion Sunga
- Children: 12

Military service
- Allegiance: First Philippine Republic; Republic of Biak-na-Bato; Katipunan (Magdiwang)
- Branch/service: Philippine Revolutionary Army
- Years of service: 1896–1901
- Rank: Major General
- Battles/wars: Philippine Revolution; Battle of Alapan; Philippine–American War; Battle of Mabitac

Juan Cailles y Kauppama (November 10, 1871 – June 28, 1951) was a Filipino general and politician. A member of the revolutionary movement Katipunan, he was a commanding officer of the Philippine Revolutionary Army who served during the Philippine Revolution and Philippine–American War. He later served as a provincial governor of Laguna and a representative from Mountain Province.

== Early life ==
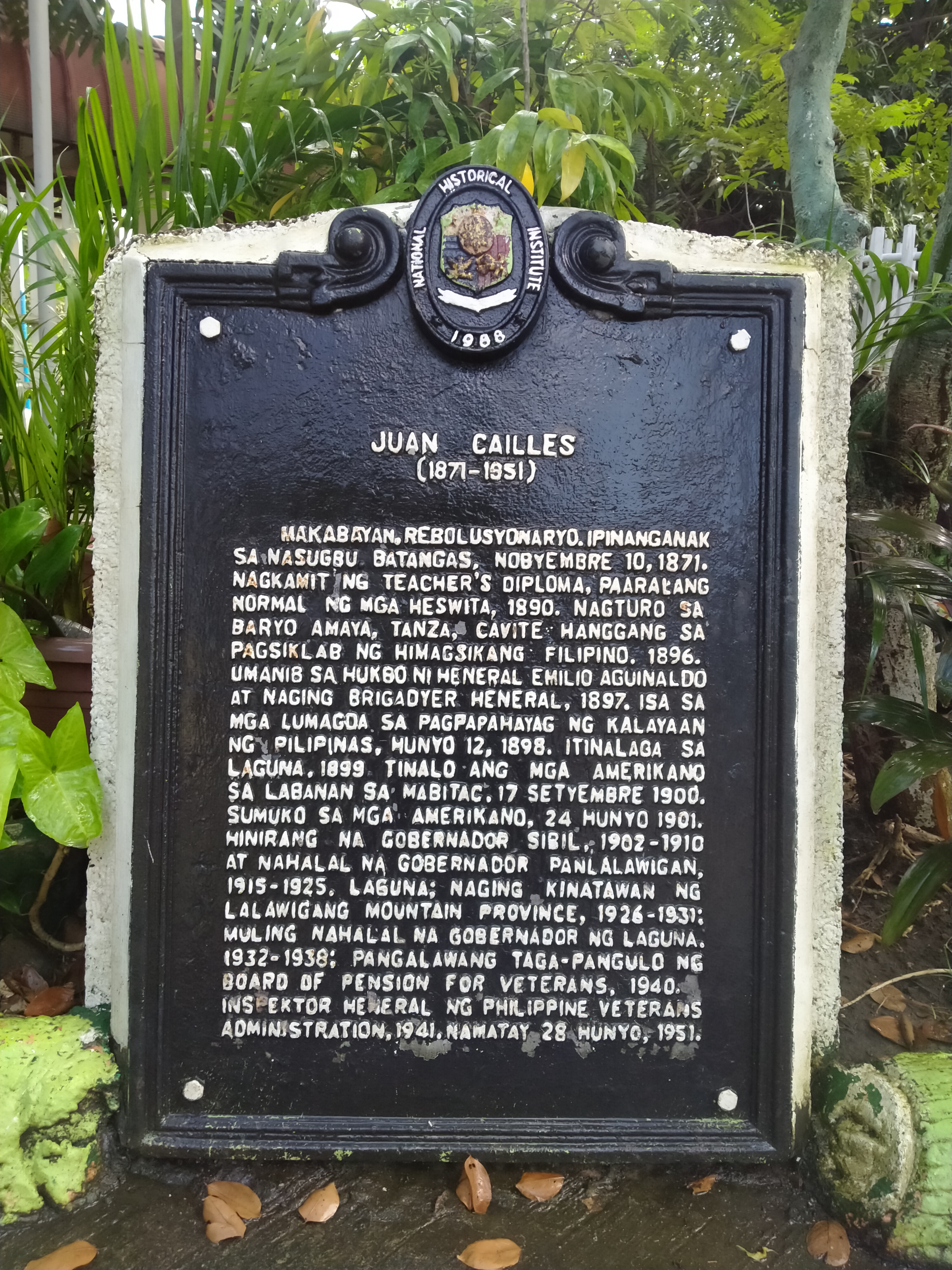
Historical marker installed in 1989 inside the Amaya Elementary School

Cailles was born in Nasugbu, Batangas, to Hippolyte Auguste Cailliez (Spanish: Hipólito Agosto Cailles y Michelot), who was born on November 5, 1837 in Valmondois, France, and Maria Kauppama (Spanish: María Caupama) of Srirangapatna in what was then British India. He was the fifth of seven children together with siblings León, Julia, Isidoro, Julio, Victoria and Cecilia.

His early education was at the house of Olvidio Caballero and he graduated from the Jesuit-run Escuela Normal in Manila (now Ateneo de Manila University).

He became a teacher and taught for five years in the public schools of Amaya, Tanza and Rosario, Cavite.

== Philippine Revolution ==
When the premature discovery of the Katipunan in Manila forced its Supremo, Andrés Bonifacio to start the Philippine Revolution, Cailles organized a force composed of his pupils' fathers. To them, he remained Maestrong Cailles despite his successive promotions in military rank.

He took part in many encounters with the Spaniards, particularly in engagements resulting in the deaths of his superior officers, such General Candido Tria Tirona, Edilberto Evangelista, and Crispulo Aguinaldo, which caused his rapid promotion. With the Pact of Biak-na-Bato in 1897, hostilities ceased.

== Philippine–American War ==
At the outbreak of the Spanish–American War in 1898, American forces arrived in the Philippines, defeating the Spanish at the Battle of Manila Bay on May 1, 1898, subsequently seizing the capital during the Battle of Manila of 1898. The Philippine–American War broke out in February 1899 with the 1899 Battle of Manila.

Cailles succeeded General Paciano Rizal as La Laguna's (present-day Laguna) military commander in July 1900 at the height of incisive attacks by the American forces. Cailles formed six military columns led by Lt. Col. Regino Diaz Relova (Pila, Bay, Calauan and Los Baños), General Severino Taino (San Pedro, Biñan, Santa Rosa, Cabuyao and Calamba), Lt. Canuto Aritao (Lumbang, Longos, San Antonio, Paete, Pakil and Pangil), Major Roman Dimayuga/Lt. Col. Pedro Caballes (Santa Cruz, Pagsanjan, Cavinti, Luisiana and Majayjay), Col. Julio Infante (Magdalena, Liliw, Rizal, Nagcarlan and San Pablo), and Lt. Col. Fidel Angeles (who died in the Battle of Mabitac) in Siniloan, Mabitac and Santa Maria.

On September 17, 1900, Cailles' troops outmaneuvered and routed a strong American contingent led by a Colonel Cheetham during the Battle of Mabitac in La Laguna. Magnanimous in victory, Cailles allowed Cheetham to recover the bodies of eight slain Americans from the field, together with all their personal belongings.

After serving as acting chief of operations in the first zone of Manila during the War, Cailles was appointed by Emilio Aguinaldo as military governor of La Laguna and half of Tayabas (now Quezon Province). Aguinaldo's capture in Palanan, Isabela on March 23, 1901, convinced Cailles that the war was lost, leading to his own surrender to American troops on June 20.

== Postwar ==
Cailles then directed his efforts toward rebuilding the country. He served as governor of Laguna from 1901 to 1910 and again from 1916 to 1925. After his second term, he was appointed representative of the Mountain Province in the Philippine Legislature in 1925 and reappointed in 1928. In 1931, Cailles was again selected governor of Laguna and reelected in 1934.

It was during his term as governor that the Sakdal uprising flared up on May 2, 1935, in Santa Rosa and Cabuyao, Laguna. The revolt was suppressed in record time, thanks to Cailles’ firm administration and revolutionary experience. Cailles had also a hand in the capture of Teodoro Asedillo, the "Terror of the Sierra".

== Death ==
Cailles died on June 28, 1951, from congestive heart failure at Philippine General Hospital in Ermita, Manila. His body was interred at the Old Cemetery of Santa Cruz, Laguna. On January 11, 2014, his remains were transferred to Libingan ng mga Bayani in Taguig.

== Images ==
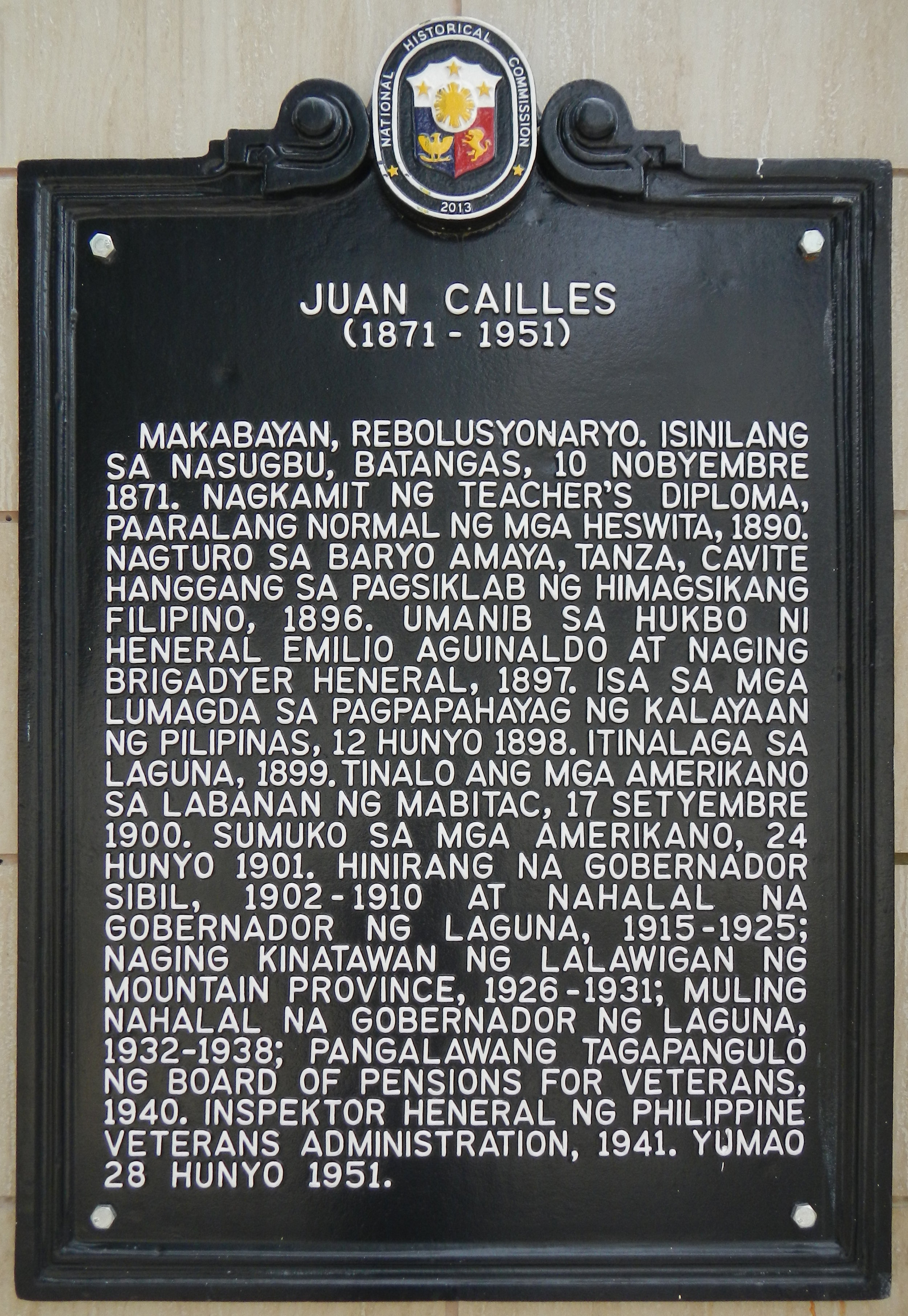
2013 historical marker installed at Cailles' monument at the Old Laguna Provincial Capital

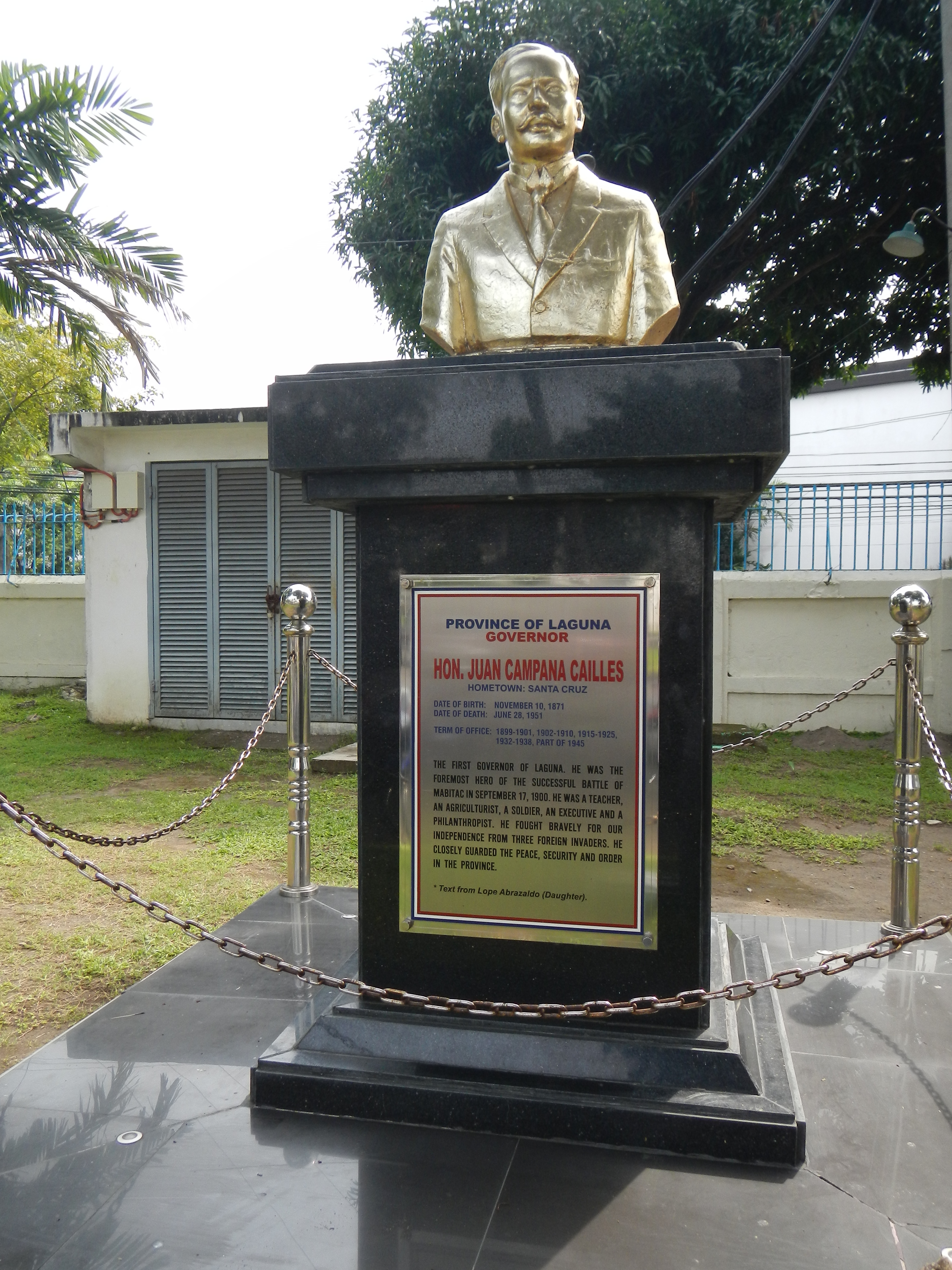
Bust of Hon. Juan Cailles in Laguna Provincial Capitol

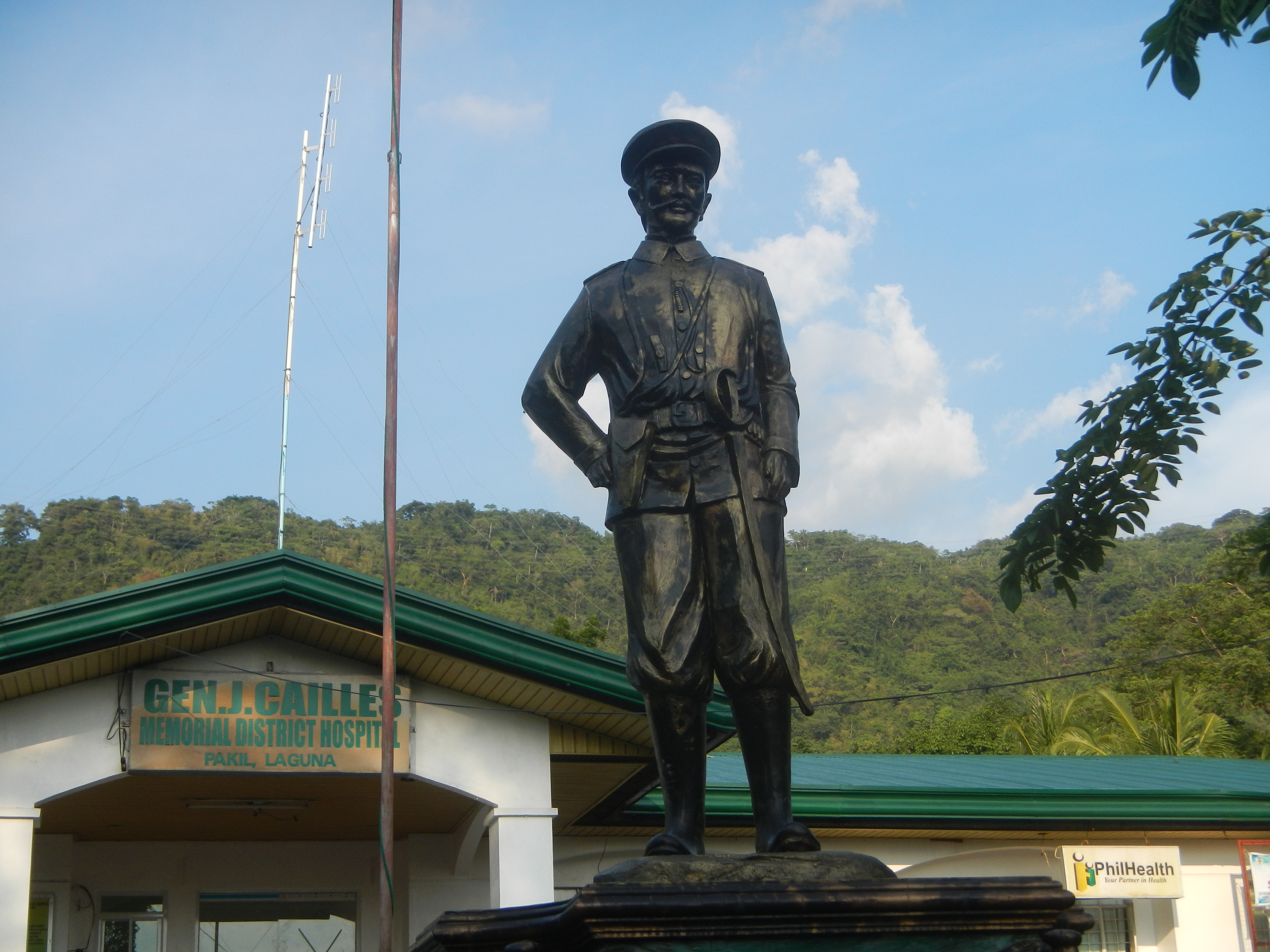
Juan Cailles statue at Gen. J. Cailles Memorial District Hospital in Pakil, Laguna
