= Mabitac =

Municipality in Laguna, Philippines

- Municipality
- Municipality of Mabitac
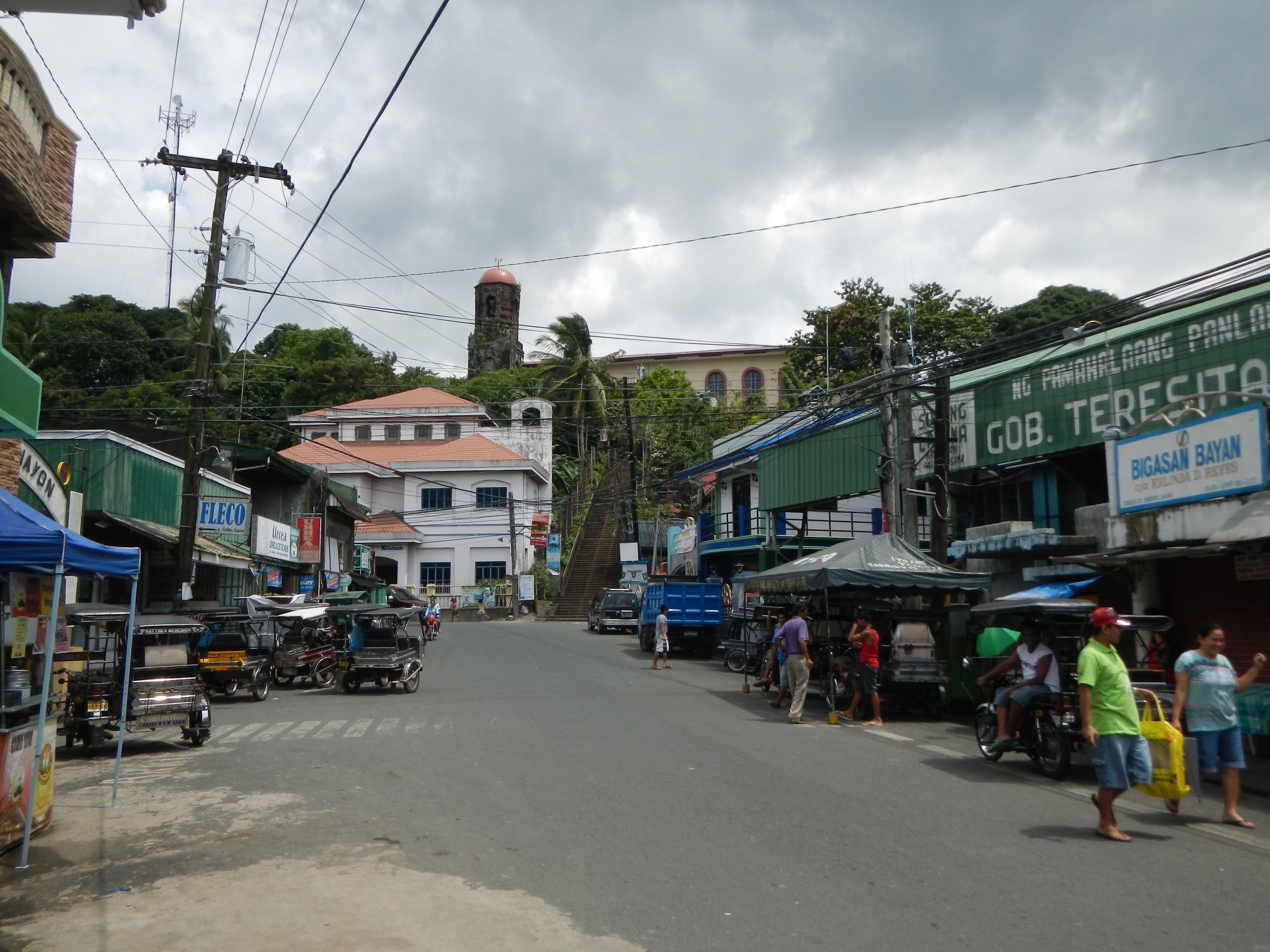
- Mabitac Poblacion

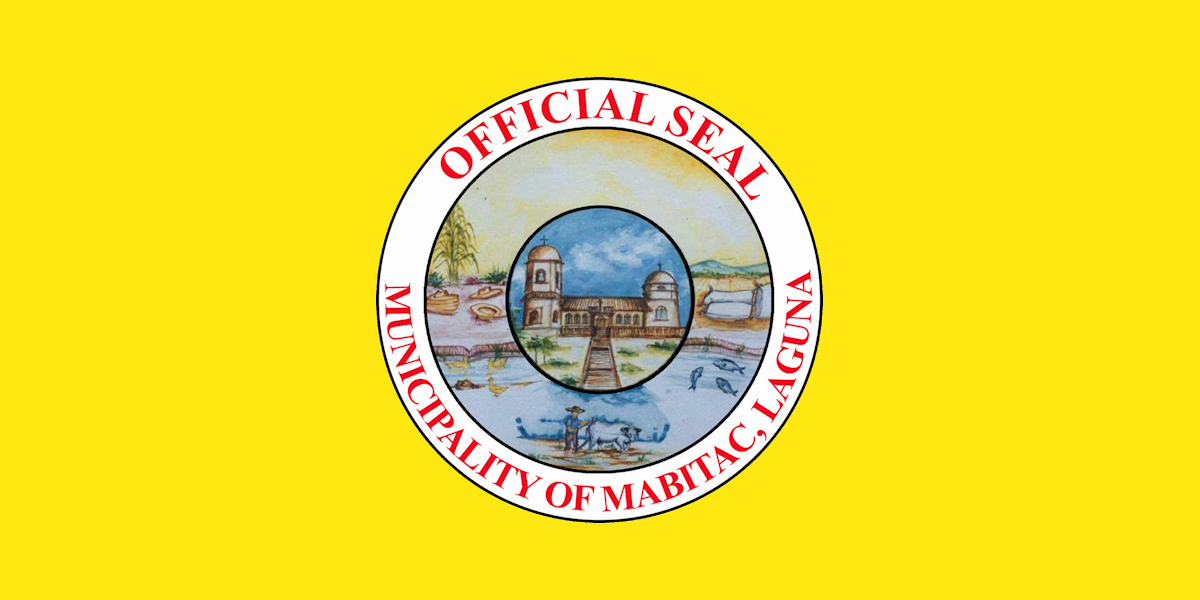
- Flag

- Map of Laguna with Mabitac highlighted
- Interactive map of Mabitac
- Location within the Philippines
- Coordinates: 14°26′N 121°25′E
- Country: Philippines
- Region: Calabarzon
- Province: Laguna
- District: 4th district
- Founded: January 6, 1616
- Barangays: 15 (see Barangays)

Government
  - Type: Sangguniang Bayan
  - Mayor: Alberto S. Reyes
  - Vice Mayor: Ronald I. Sana
  - Representative: Benjamin Cueto "Benjie" Agarao Jr.
  - Municipal Council: Members: Ferdinand D. Bobadilla; Gerardo C. Fader; Angelito V. Valderrama Sr.; John Rafael F. Eroma; Romar M. Merano; Magie G. Anievas-De Luna; Felipe J. Barba; Paolo C. Villanueva
  - Electorate: 14,935 voters (2025)

Area
  - Total: 80.76 km^{2} (31.18 sq mi)
- Elevation: 128 m (420 ft)
- Highest elevation: 726 m (2,382 ft)
- Lowest elevation: −1 m (−3.3 ft)

Population (2024 census)
  - Total: 21,748
  - Density: 269.3/km^{2} (697.5/sq mi)
  - Households: 5,022

Economy
  - Income class: 4th municipal income class
  - Poverty incidence: 16.25% (2023)
  - Revenue: ₱ 130.8 million (2024)
  - Assets: ₱ 313.3 million (2024)
  - Expenditure: ₱ 120.3 million (2024)
  - Liabilities: ₱ 81.22 million (2024)

Service provider
  - Electricity: First Laguna Electric Cooperative (FLECO)
- Time zone: UTC+8 (PST)
- ZIP code: 4020
- PSGC: 0403414000
- IDD : area code: +63 (0)49
- Native languages: Tagalog
- Website: www.mabitac.gov.ph

Mabitac, officially the Municipality of Mabitac (Tagalog: Bayan ng Mabitac), is a municipality in the province of Laguna, Philippines. According to the 2024 census, it has a population of 21,748 people.

== Etymology ==
Mabitac was once known as an abundant hunting ground for wild game several centuries ago. Early inhabitants used numerous traps, locally called bitag, to catch animals. As a result, the area came to be known as “Mabitag,” meaning “a place with many traps,” which eventually evolved into its present name, Mabitac.

== History ==
The first Spaniards who came to this place were the friars who established the first Spanish settlement in the area and began to Christianize the local population. The Spaniards, having difficulty in pronouncing the "G" consonant, called this place "Mabitac" whenever they mentioned this place. Eventually, the name found its way in the official records and maps of Laguna made by Spanish cartographers and mariners who chartered the coastal areas of Laguna de Bay.

This town was formerly a barrio of Siniloan, an immediate neighboring town. It became an independent municipality in 1611, not by legislation, but by mutual agreement between the Spanish friars of both towns who were then the influential ruling class. The 1818 Spanish census recorded the area having 525 native families and three Spanish-Filipino families.

Mabitac was the site of a battle in the Philippine–American War, when on September 17, 1900, Filipinos under General Juan Cailles defeated an American force commanded by Colonel Benjamin F. Cheatham.

=== World War II and Japanese occupation ===
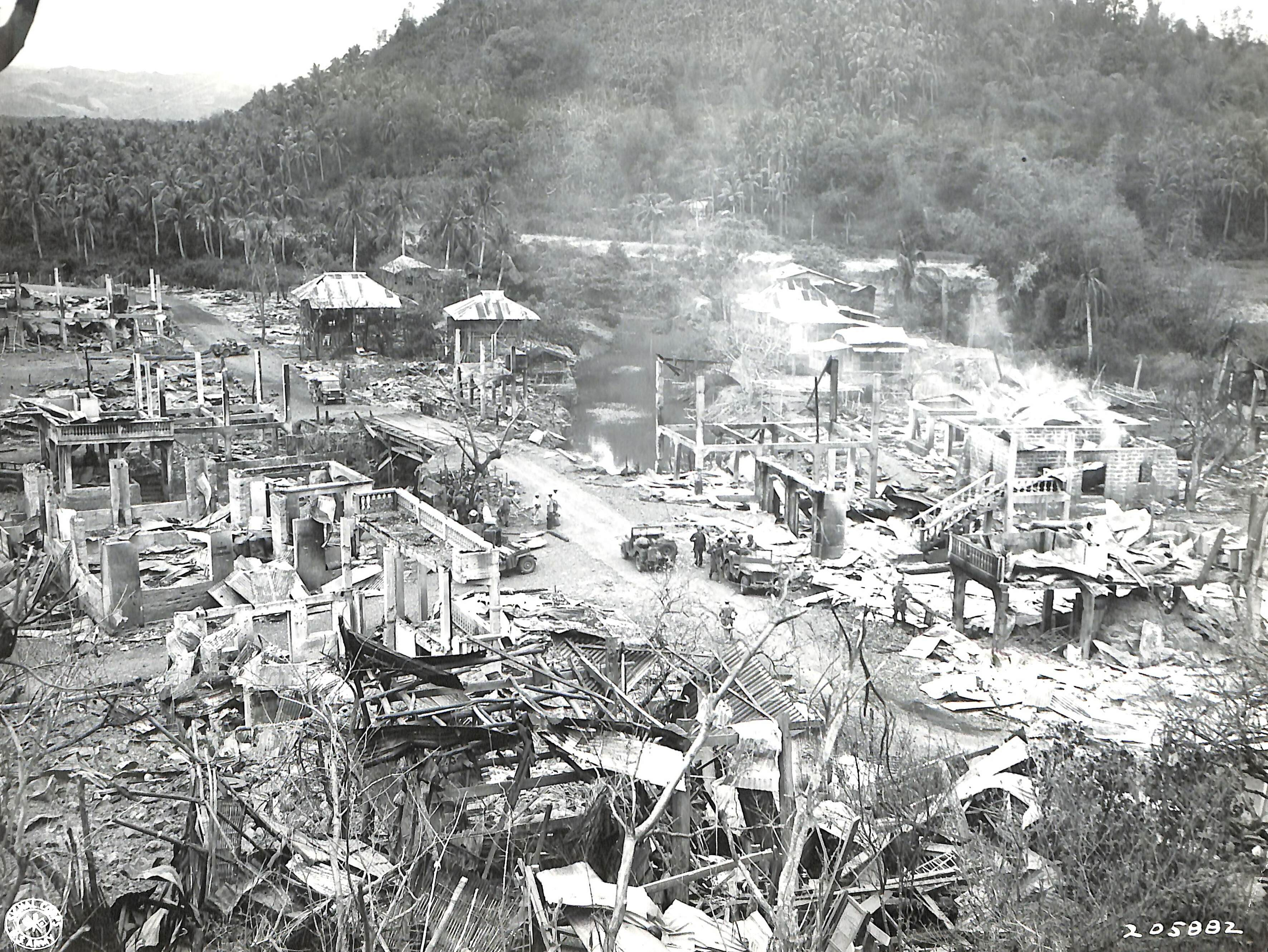
Destroyed buildings in Mabitac (1945)

In 1942, Japanese soldiers entered and occupied Mabitac. In 1945, the Philippine guerrillas defeated the Japanese and liberated Mabitac.

== Geography ==
Mabitac is 30 kilometres (19 mi) from Santa Cruz, 76 kilometres (47 mi) from Manila, and 59 kilometres (37 mi) from Antipolo.

=== Barangays ===
Mabitac is politically subdivided into 15 barangays, as indicated below: Each barangay consists of puroks and some have sitios.

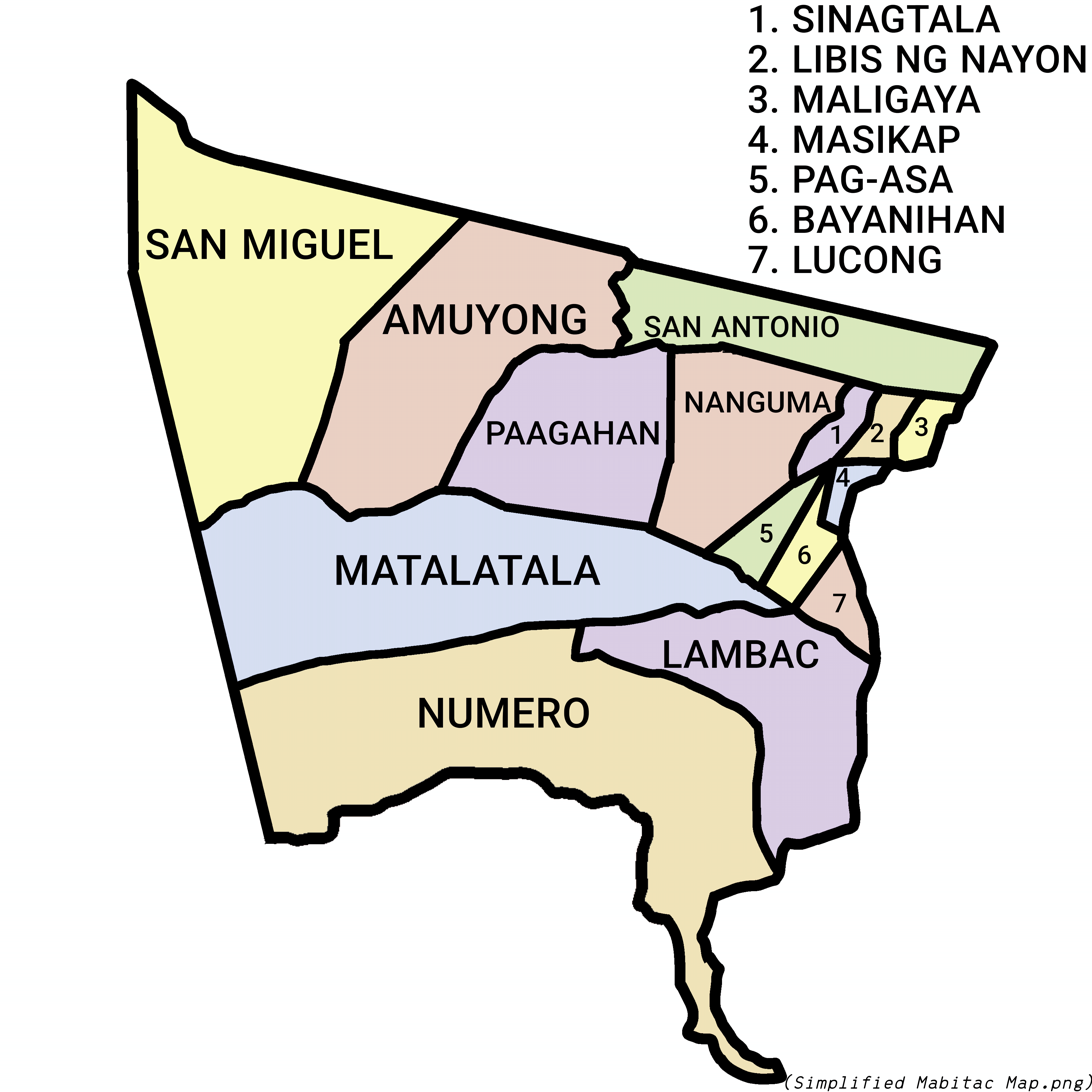
Brgy. Map of Mabitac

- Amuyong
- Lambac (Poblacion)
- Lucong (Poblacion)
- Matalatala
- Nanguma
- Numero
- Paagahan
- Bayanihan (Poblacion)
- Libis ng Nayon (Poblacion)
- Maligaya (Poblacion)
- Masikap (Poblacion)
- Pag-Asa (Poblacion)
- Sinagtala (Poblacion)
- San Antonio
- San Miguel

=== Climate ===
Climate data for Mabitac, Laguna
Month	Jan	Feb	Mar	Apr	May	Jun	Jul	Aug	Sep	Oct	Nov	Dec	Year
Mean daily maximum °C (°F)	26 (79)	27 (81)	29 (84)	31 (88)	31 (88)	30 (86)	29 (84)	29 (84)	29 (84)	29 (84)	28 (82)	26 (79)	29 (84)
Mean daily minimum °C (°F)	22 (72)	22 (72)	22 (72)	23 (73)	24 (75)	25 (77)	24 (75)	24 (75)	24 (75)	24 (75)	24 (75)	23 (73)	23 (74)
Average precipitation mm (inches)	58 (2.3)	41 (1.6)	32 (1.3)	29 (1.1)	91 (3.6)	143 (5.6)	181 (7.1)	162 (6.4)	172 (6.8)	164 (6.5)	113 (4.4)	121 (4.8)	1,307 (51.5)
Average rainy days	13.4	9.3	9.1	9.8	19.1	22.9	26.6	24.9	25.0	21.4	16.5	16.5	214.5
Source: Meteoblue

== Demographics ==
Population census of Mabitac
Year	Pop.	±% p.a.
1903	1,052	—
1918	760	−2.14%
1939	1,973	+4.65%
1948	2,700	+3.55%
1960	4,316	+3.99%
1970	6,377	+3.98%
1975	7,415	+3.07%
1980	8,543	+2.87%
1990	11,444	+2.97%
1995	13,309	+2.87%
2000	15,097	+2.74%
2007	17,608	+2.14%
2010	18,618	+2.05%
2015	20,530	+1.88%
2020	21,275	+0.75%
2024	21,748	+0.53%
Source: Philippine Statistics Authority

In the 2024 census, the population of Mabitac was 21,748 people, with a density of 270 inhabitants per square kilometre or 700 inhabitants per square mile.

== Economy ==
Poverty incidence of Mabitac (%)

Source: Philippine Statistics Authority

== Education ==
The Famy-Mabitac Schools District Office governs all educational institutions within the municipality. It oversees the management and operations of all private and public, from primary to secondary schools.

=== Primary and elementary schools ===
- E.W. De Vela Elementary School
- Eugenia Games Olarte Reyes Elementary School
- Mabitac Elementary School
- Matalatala Elementary School
- Nanguma Elementary School
- Numero Elementary School
- Paagahan Elementary School

=== Secondary schools ===
- Mabitac National High School
- Paagahan Integrated National High School
- Matalatala Integrated National High School

== Gallery ==
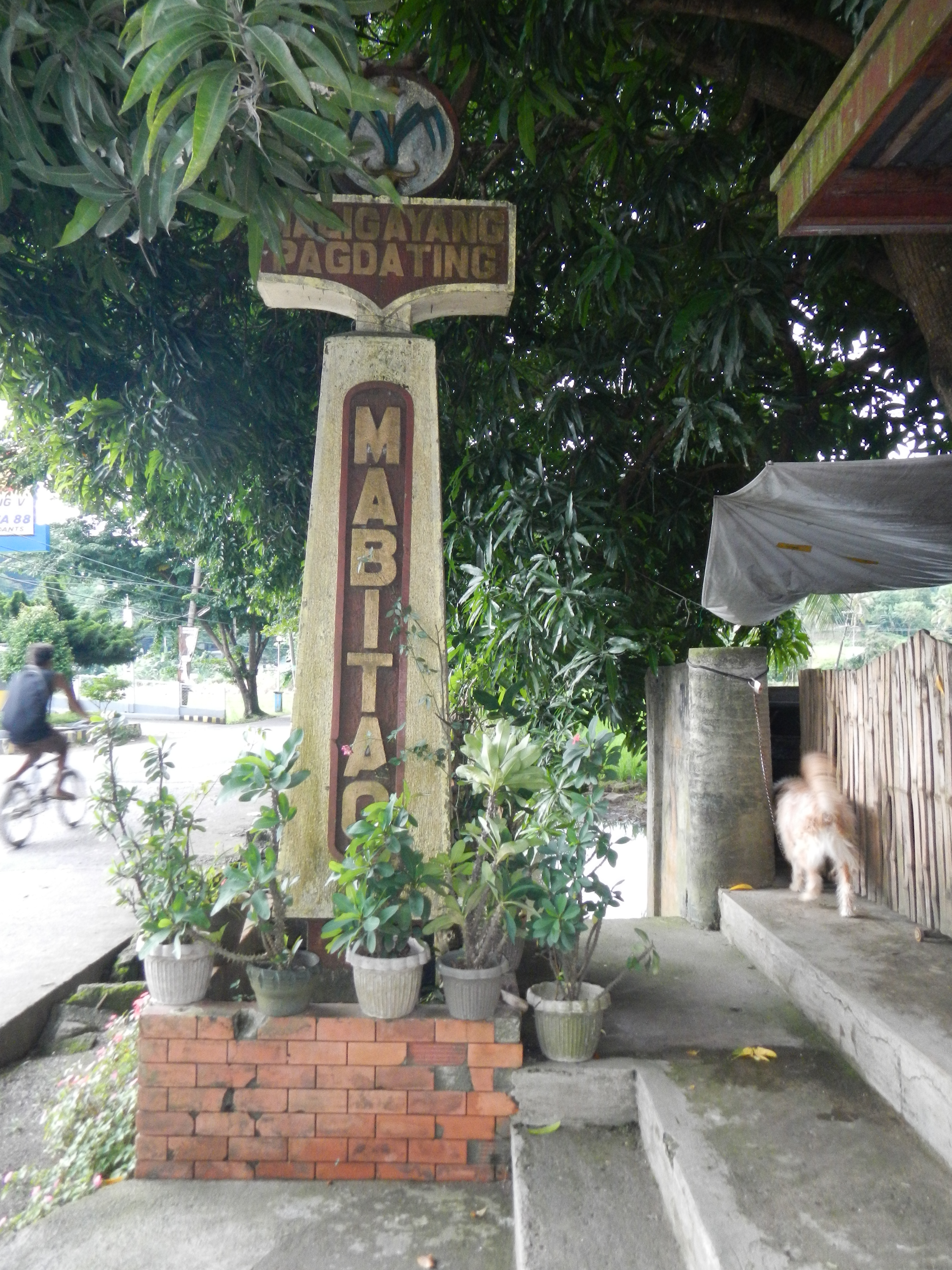
Welcome marker

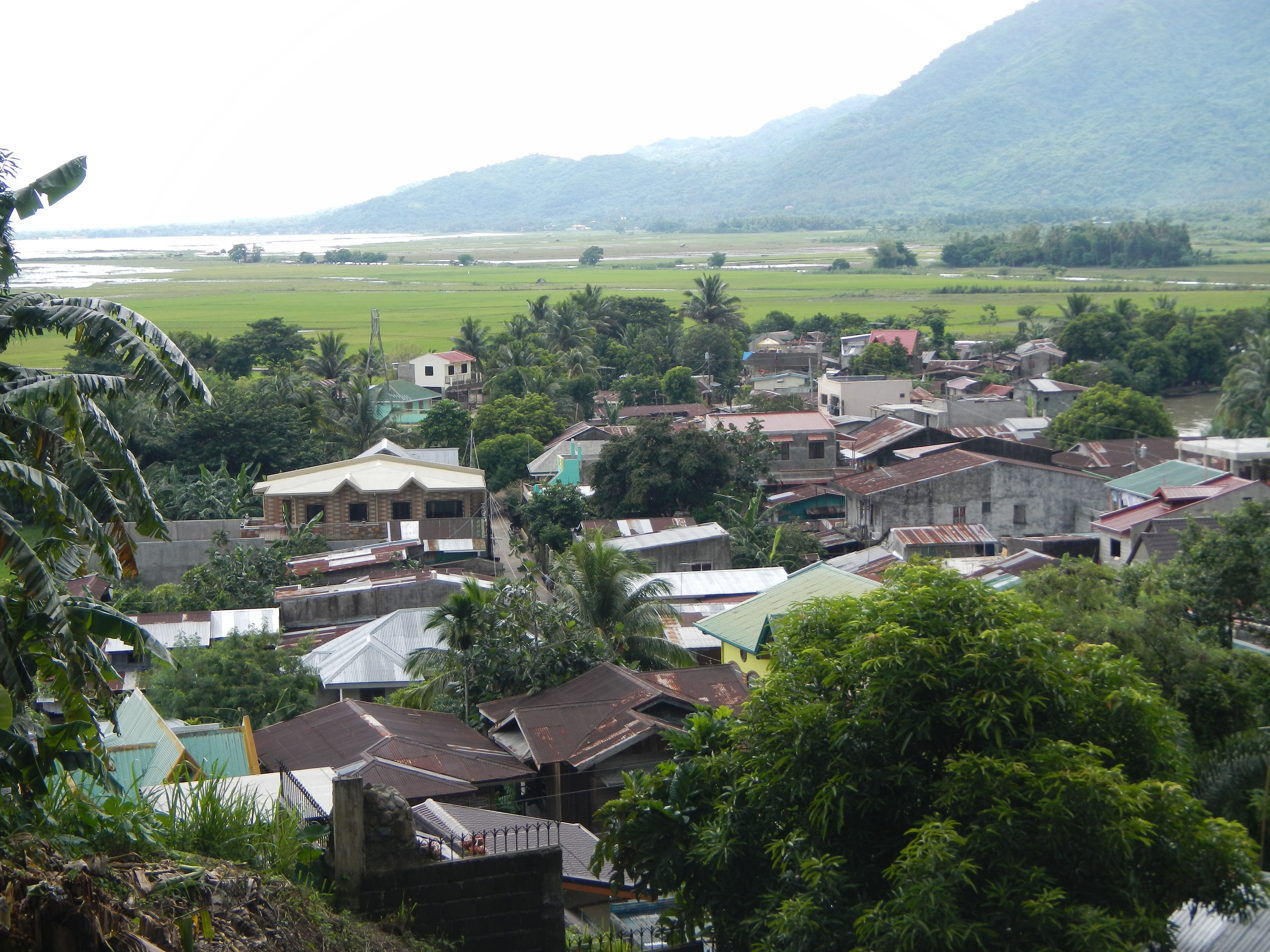
Hilltop view of Mabitac

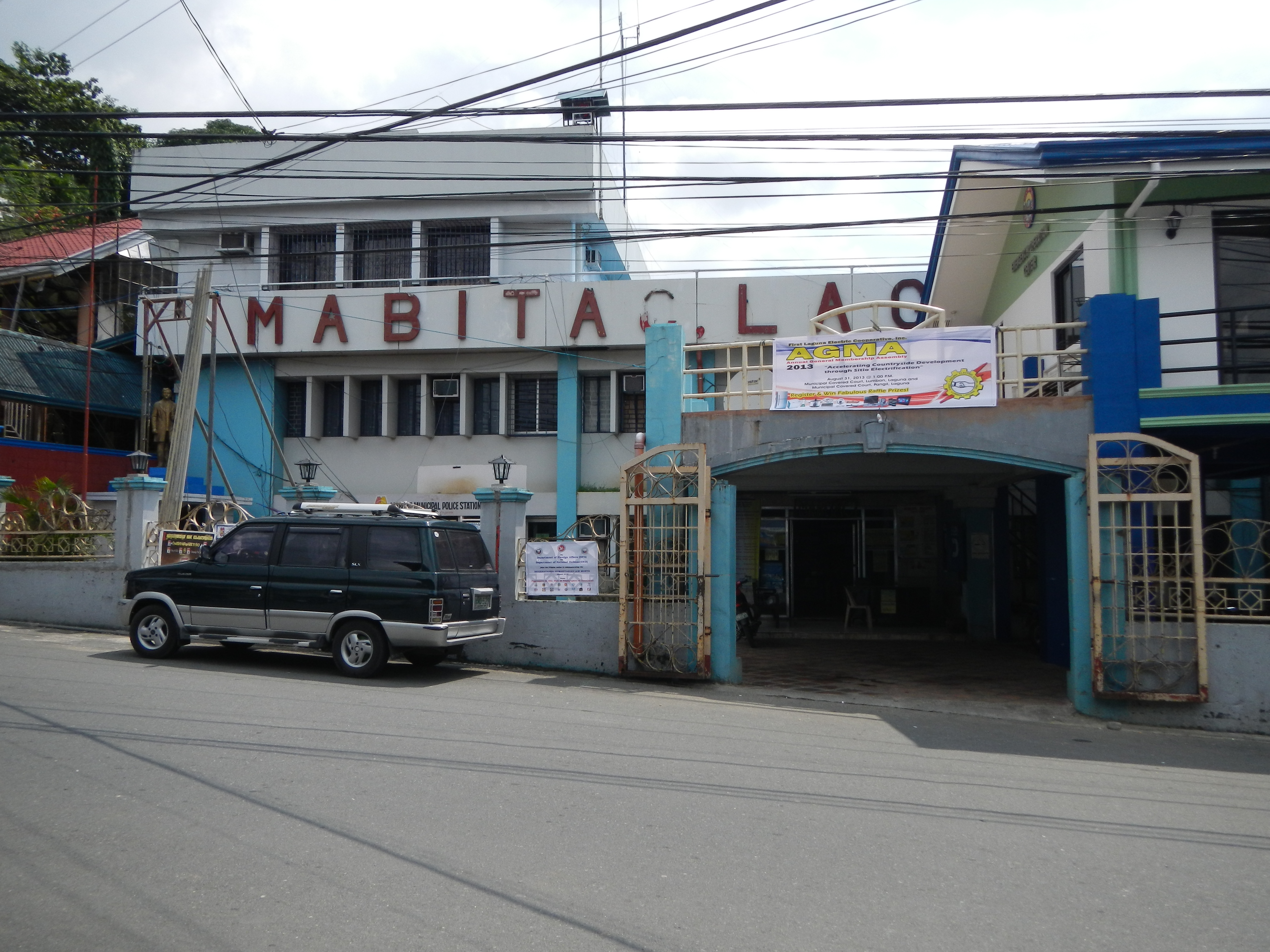
Town hall

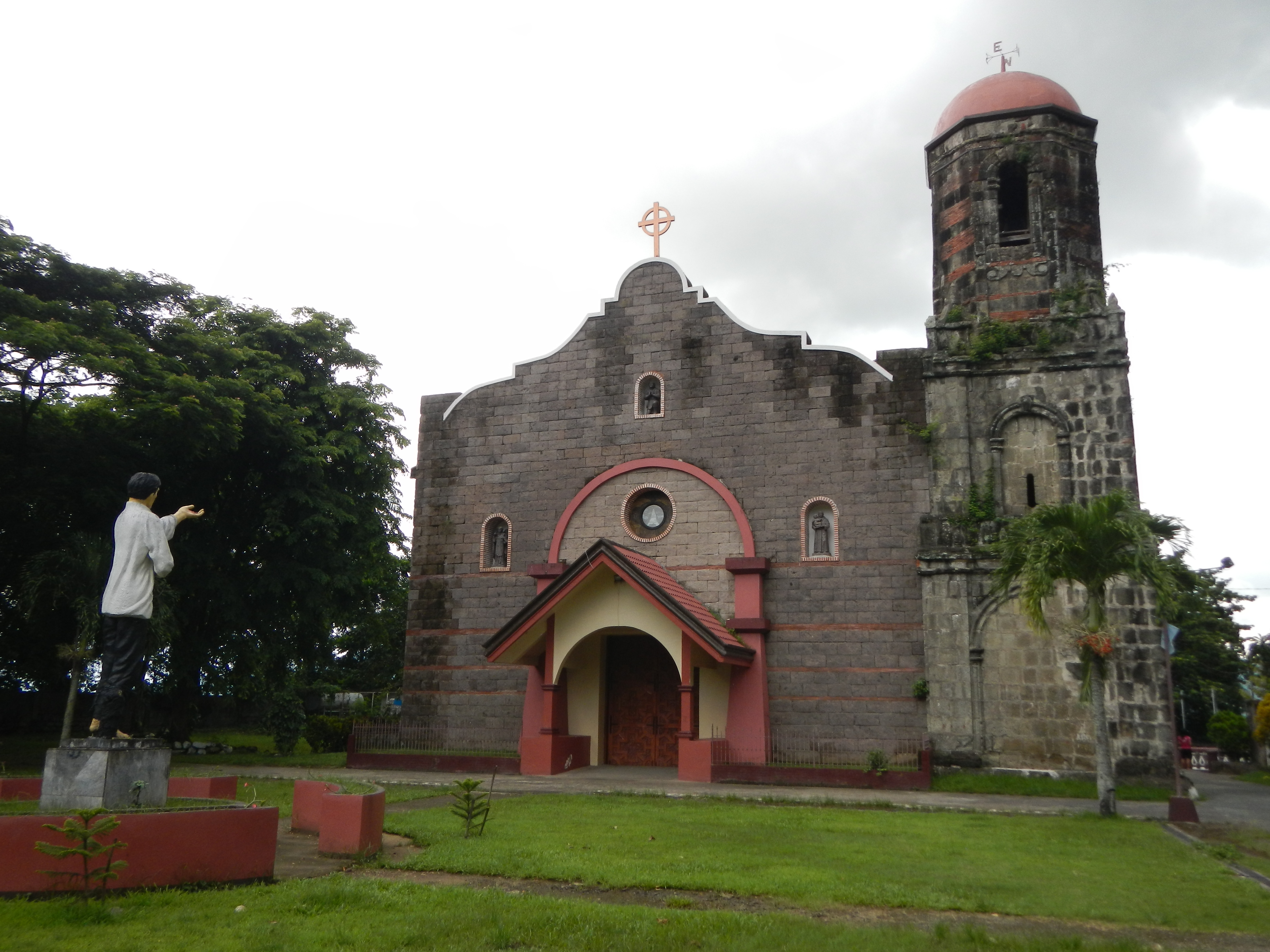
Nuestra Señora de Candelaria Parish Church

== Notable personalities ==
- Juan Cailles (born Juan Cailles y Kauppama; November 10, 1871 – June 28, 1951) was a Filipino of French-Indian descent. A member of the revolutionary movement Katipunan, he was a commanding officer of the Philippine Revolutionary Army who served during the Philippine Revolution and Philippine–American War. He later served as a provincial Governor of Laguna and a member of the Philippine Legislature.

== See also ==
- Battle of Mabitac
