= Battle of Mabitac =

1900 battle of the Philippine-American War

- Part of the Philippine–American War
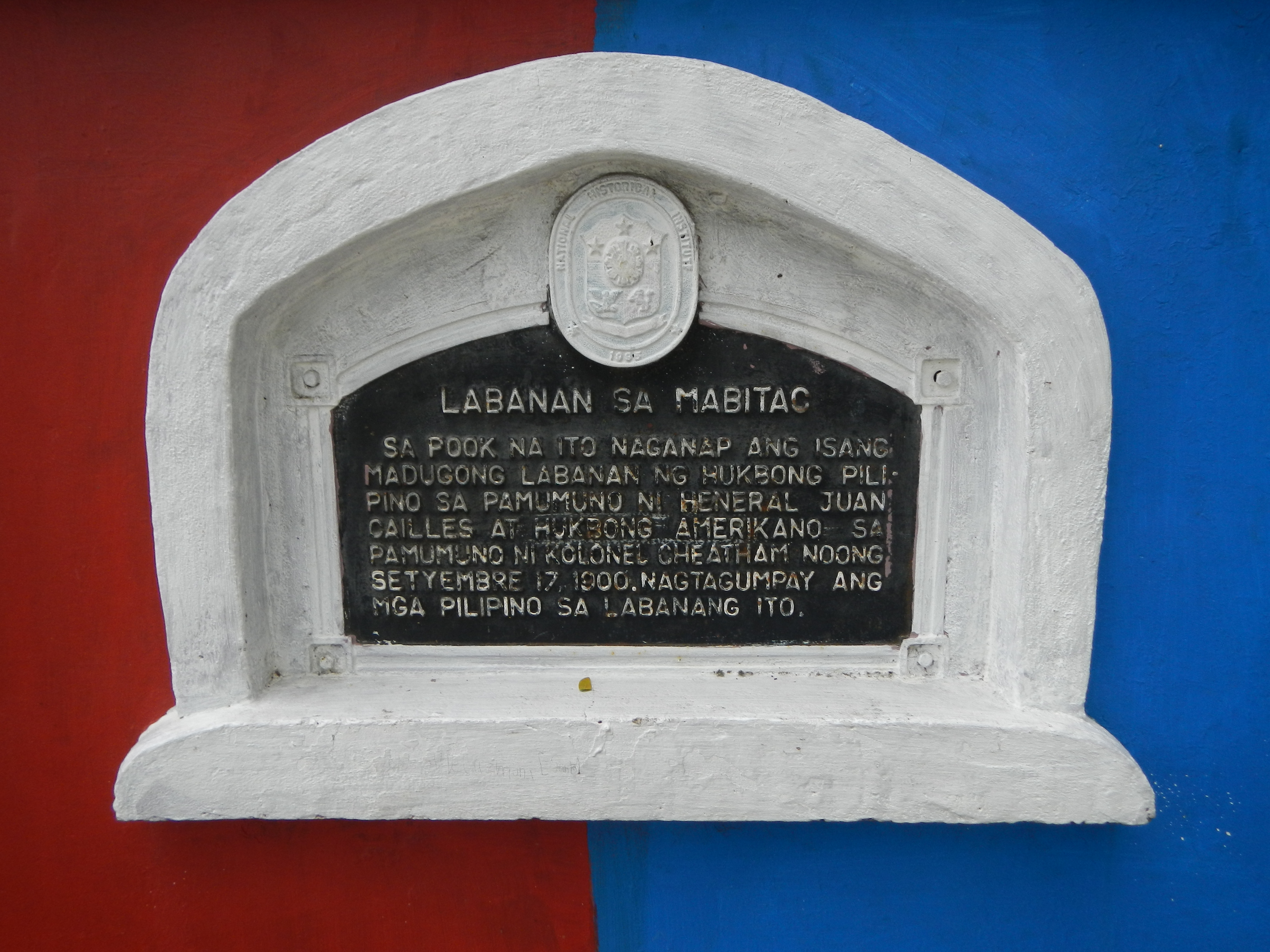
- Battle of Mabitac historic marker
Date	September 17, 1900
Location	Mabitac, Laguna, Philippines
Result	Filipino victory

Belligerents
Philippine Republic	United States

Commanders and leaders
Juan Cailles	Benjamin Cheatham Jr.

Strength
300~ Filipino soldiers (Filipino account); 800 Filipinos (American estimate)	300~ 37th and 15th U.S. Volunteer Infantry; Several gunboats

Casualties and losses
11 killed, 20 wounded (American estimate); 2 dead, 3 wounded (Filipino claim)	21 killed, 23 wounded (American claim); 180 dead and wounded (Filipino estimate)

The Battle of Mabitac (Filipino: Labanan sa Mabitac, Spanish: Batalla de Mabitac) was an engagement in the Philippine–American War, when on September 17, 1900, Filipinos under General Juan Cailles defeated an American force commanded by Colonel Benjamin F. Cheatham, Jr.

Mabitac was linked to the garrison town of Siniloan by a causeway which, on the day of the battle, was flooded with water (in many parts waist-deep). The water in the flanking rice fields was even deeper, making it impossible to properly deploy off the narrow road. Trenches occupied by Filipinos under Cailles cut across this causeway, blocking the path into Mabitac.

The battle began when elements of the 37th Infantry Regiment and 15th Infantry Regiment, advancing from Siniloan, came under intense fire some 400 yards from the enemy trenches, estimated at 800 in strength. Eight troops sent ahead to scout the enemy positions died to the last man as they closed to within 50 yards of the Filipinos. One of the last to fall was 2nd Lieutenant George Cooper. General Cailles, in an honorable gesture, let the defeated Cheatham recover the bodies of the eight slain soldiers after the battle.

Meanwhile, the main body of U.S. Infantry had become pinned down in the waist-deep mud, still several hundred yards from the Filipino trenches. Unable to properly deploy, and in a dangerously exposed position, they engaged in a firefight with Philippine forces for nearly 90 minutes. Despite the bravery of one Captain John E. Moran, later awarded the Medal of Honor for trying to rally his demoralized comrades, the Americans were badly mauled, sustaining scores of casualties.

Even supporting fire from a U.S. Navy gunboat (some 1,300 yards distant) and an attempted flank attack by 60 Americans, who had not participated in the costly frontal assault, could not dent the Filipino position, and Cheatham withdrew soon after. Eventually, General Cailles managed a skillful withdrawal in order to avoid envelopment, and by the next day, his entire command had made good their escape.

According to the Americans the US Army lost some 21 killed and 23 wounded in the battle, an effective loss of 33% of their strength (termed a "profoundly impressive loss" by American Brigadier General Arthur MacArthur, Jr. in an effort to allay the potential shock on U.S. servicemen). American estimates put Filipino losses at 11 killed and 20 wounded. Numbered among their dead was Lieutenant Colonel Fidel Sario.

A differing version of the battle exists in the Philippine Revolutionary Records. A letter addressed to a Miguel Estrada by one Faustin Pantua says this:

"Mr. Miguel Estrada,

With the greatest satisfaction I inform you that coming from the operations over the towns of Baybay, I have arrived in this camp with my General and other companions in good condition, without a single casualty, thanks be to God, the same thing which I desire for you and your appreciated family. As a result of our operations I can say that on the 17th, the town of Mavitac having been occupied by our forces from the night of the 14th, on the morning of the first day mentioned, we were attacked by the enemy to the number of 300, by land and sea. We being the defenders of the place, were only about 300 of us, more or less. In fact the fire began at six o’clock in the morning, attacking the point occupied by our General and where I was the enemy made the attack in four columns whose fire alternated with shots from the cannons of the gun boats, which they had in the waters of the Laguna, opposite the said town. Three times they wanted to charge with bayonets, but they failed in their attempt, only realizing their complete defeat. The troops attempted to land on the right flank of the place attacked but did not succeed in doing so because our troops prevented them with volleys which compelled them to retreat to the gun boat from where they came. The enemy being completely repulsed and the battle field sown with corpses on account of the casualties we had caused. The enemy fell back towards Siniloan, the gun boats to Paete. As a result of the combat, the enemy had 180 casualties in dead and wounded. Among the first could be counted, one Major, one Captain and some subaltern officers, according to reliable information. On our side we only have to lament five casualties, two dead and three wounded. Among the first could be found the brave Lieutenant Colonel, Don Fidel S. Angeles. On account of the advantages that strategy advises, already our soldiers being in need of ammunition, we were compelled to evacuate the town and concentrate our forces in the central cuartel of the forces which operate over the towns of Baybay from where we perceived and discerned the enemy attacking anew, by land and sea, from ten o'clock in the morning until two in the afternoon, in which they took the town or entered it without resistance. Once in the town, as it appeared, they got news of the death of our Lieutenant Colonel, to make it appear perhaps that the corpse fell into their hands or power. They clothed a certain person [with clothes] from the Lieutenant Colonel on an officer of the naval reserve whom they held for many years in the "Calabus" in Paete and killed him in the town. What brutality! What infamy for a nation that prides itself on being civilized and humane! Enough of americanism! Then long live the Filipino Republic!

In respect to the duty your beloved sister was entrusted with I would desire that you do me the favor to send me an account of what she was able to buy in Manila with an expression of the amount or value of each in order to be able to dispose of it by means of a person of my confidence, which may be collected, the price for her total amount. Without anything further for the present, with regards to you and your family. I remain your true and faithful friend and your servant who kisses your hands.

Faustin Pantua"

American Major General John C. Bates later said of this battle: "It is deemed charitable as well as politic to drop a veil over this matter rather than to give any publicity that can be avoided."

After this First Battle of Mabitac in 1900, a second battle was fought here during the Second World War in 1945. The town was liberated from the Japanese Imperial Army by the Philippine Commonwealth troops of the 4th, 41st, 42nd and 43rd Infantry Division of the Philippine Army and the 4th Constabulary Regiment of the Philippine Constabulary with some guerrilla elements.
