= 1951 in the Philippines =

- Decades: 1930s; 1940s; 1950s; 1960s; 1970s
- See also: List of years in the Philippines; films

1951 in the Philippines details events of note that happened in the Philippines in 1951

== Incumbents ==
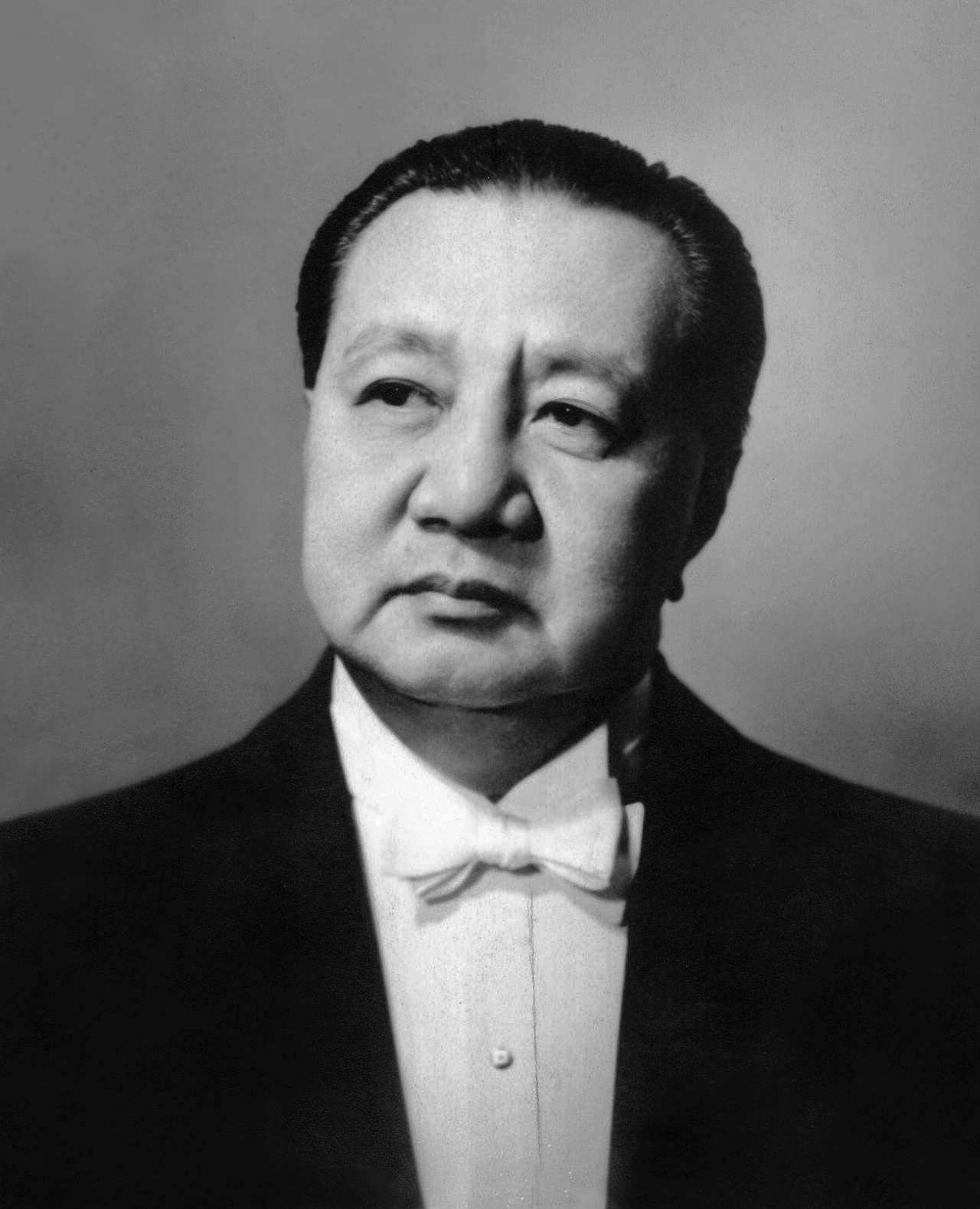
President Elpidio Quirino

- President: Elpidio Quirino (Liberal)
- Vice President: Fernando Lopez (Liberal)
- Chief Justice:
  - Manuel Moran (until March 20)
  - Ricardo Paras (starting April 2)
- Congress: 2nd

== Events ==
=== January ===
- January 9 – Twenty-eight Hukbalahap members are killed by government forces while 15 more are captured in three separate battles nationwide.
- January 12 – Hukbalahap conducts series of raids in Luzon. In Hermosa, Bataan, an estimated 200 rebels ambush three buses, burn houses, and kill nineteen; two Huks are later killed in an encounter with the army. Separate incidents are also reported in Tuy, Batangas; Nueva Ecija; and Santa Ignacia, Tarlac; 25 people are killed overall.
- January 18 – The national government launches Operation Saber, ordering 15,000 troops to neutralize 5,000 communist Huks in northern and central Luzon. Within the first three days, 28 rebels are killed. The Army offensive, being concentrated in Huk locations in Pampanga particularly near Mount Arayat, ends in February with the insurgents successfully driven out.
- January 24 – Intelligence sources report that a group of alleged Chinese communists, including a businessman and four others who have been aiding the Huks and plotting to assassinate government officials including President Quirino, have been captured.
- Mid- or Late January – President Quirino sign a bill for ten additional battalion combat teams, in another effort to eliminate the Huk rebels.

=== February ===
- February 16 – Ten soldiers are reported killed when an Army patrol is ambushed by the Huks at the foot of Mount Arayat in Pampanga.
- February 22 – President Quirino formally launches EDCOR (Economic Development Corps) projects, whose objective is establishing settlements for former Huks, with the opening of the country's first—the Arevalo ECDOR farm in Kapatagan Valley, Lanao. It will be inaugurated on March 6; and about two months later, the first batch of settlers will be brought to the site.

=== March ===
- March 1 – Government-run periodical The Philippine Herald fires 64 employees being alleged subversives, mostly members of the communist Philippine Newspaper Guild, among them Jose Lansang, Teddy Benigno, and 12 other members of the editorial staff.
- March 4–11 – The Philippines participates in the first ever Asian Games held in New Delhi, India. With 3 gold medals, the country is ranked 5th in the medal tally and 3rd place in the over-all medal count.
- March 6 – Fort Santiago is declared a National Shrine.

=== May ===
- May 11 – Ending a half-a-year trial of 29 communist leaders, judge Oscar Castelo gives death sentences to five Huk leaders and a field commander; life imprisonment to nine and lower to eleven; all for rebellion with murder, arson, and robbery. Three more are acquitted. The defendants have been convicted, particularly for the 1949 ambush of former First Lady Aurora Quezon and nine other individuals, and the 1950 burning of an army hospital in Makabulos that killed 32.
- May 12 – Roxas becomes a city in the province of Capiz through Republic Act 603.

=== June ===
- June 18 – Thirteen leaders of the Congress of Labor Organizations, a defunct communist group, including its former president and Manila city councilor Amado Hernandez who have been detained since January, are charged of planning a rebellion.

=== July ===
- July 31 — A military encounter against the Hukbalahap in Laguna results in the deaths of 15 guerrillas and two army soldiers.

=== August ===
- Early August:
  - Independent election monitoring group NAMFREL, then as the National Movement for Free Elections, is established in time for the elections with the induction of its first officers and board members, which involve members of service organizations.
  - The United States Department of State releases pamphlets on their inquiry which reveals the attempt by Hukbalahap guerillas to overthrow the government between November and May 1952.
- August 30:
  - The Mutual Defense Treaty between the Philippines and the United States is signed in the Washington, D.C., the first among other agreements in the Pacific region that generally aims to prevent any aggression. It will be implemented in 1954.
  - The military reports that 26 individuals, among them 20 Huks, are killed in a battle between several army companies and a hundred guerrillas at the Laguna–Batangas boundary.

=== September ===
- September 13 – President Quirino signs Proclamation No. 274, establishing the National Fund and Educational Drive of the Philippine Tuberculosis Society
- September 28 – Guillermo Capadocia, the second-ranking Huk official, is killed following a battle between his group and an Army task force in San Remigio, Antique.

=== October ===
- October 7 – Asiong Salonga, a popular gangster in Tondo, Manila, is fatally shot by a henchman linked to his rival Carlos "Totoy Golem" Capistrano, also a gang leader, in a drinking spree.

=== November ===
- November 12 – Huks launch an evening raid at Santa Ana, Pampanga, burning the municipal hall and a marketplace; nine are killed, including seven rebels and an army soldier. Heavy fighting ensues at Mount Arayat between the Philippine Army and an estimated 300 rebels.
- November 13 – Elections for nine senators and local officials are held; at the same time the first mayoral election for Manila. The opposition Nacionalista Party would win the majority of the legislative seats against the Liberals; claiming all in the Senate. Meanwhile, 21 are killed in violent incidents, including five Huks in clashes in Nueva Ecija and Laguna, bringing the toll to 116 since the start of campaigning two months prior.
- November 21 – A typhoon hits Visayas, killing 82 and causing massive damages.

=== December ===
- December 2–3 – Huks conduct three separate raids in the municipalities of Santa Rita, Hermosa, and Infanta, burning the municipal halls; four are killed and 14 are kidnapped. In Santa Rita, more than a hundred residents are held captive in the town square and escape following an explosion in the hall.
- December 4 – Series of eruptions of Mount Hibok-Hibok in Camiguin island (then part of Misamis Oriental) begin, causing massive ash falls and lava flows that affect half of twelve surrounding sitios. Confirmed deaths reportedly range at 206–266 while estimating the possible toll up to as high as 2,000.
- December 9 – Typhoon Amy landfalls at the island provinces of Samar and Leyte; affecting the entire Visayas and parts of Luzon and, by December 15, killing at least 626 with hundreds reported missing. Leyte is the worst-hit with at least 457 deaths; casualties are also reported in the islands of Samar, Cebu, Negros, and Panay. Damages are estimated at $20 million, in the country's strongest tropical cyclone at that time with winds up to 130 mph.
- December 12–13 – Twenty-five persons, 19 of them Huks, are reportedly killed in series of violent incidents involving the said communist group in the entire Luzon.
- December 12 — President Quirino, through a proclamation, declares state of public calamity in Camiguin island due to the impact of the eruption of Mount Hibok-Hibok; and in the entire Visayas and the provinces of Romblon and Masbate due to Typhoon Amy.

== Holidays ==
As per Act No. 2711 section 29, issued on March 10, 1917, any legal holiday of fixed date falls on Sunday, the next succeeding day shall be observed as legal holiday. Sundays are also considered legal religious holidays. Bonifacio Day was added through Philippine Legislature Act No. 2946. It was signed by then-Governor General Francis Burton Harrison in 1921. On October 28, 1931, the Act No. 3827 was approved declaring the last Sunday of August as National Heroes Day.

- January 1 – New Year's Day
- February 22 – Legal Holiday
- March 29 – Maundy Thursday
- March 30 – Good Friday
- May 1 – Labor Day
- July 4 – Philippine Republic Day
- August 13 – Legal Holiday
- August 26 – National Heroes Day
- November 22 – Thanksgiving Day
- November 30 – Bonifacio Day
- December 25 – Christmas Day
- December 30 – Rizal Day

== Births ==
- January 28 – Oscar Orbos, Philippine TV Personality
- February 18 – Isabel Preysler, Filipina socialite and television host.
- February 28 – Oscar Moreno, Filipino politician.
- March 10 – Gloria Diaz, Filipino model and actress, Miss Universe 1969
- March 17 – Junix Inocian, Filipino stage, television and film actor (died 2015)
- March 29 – Tina Monzon-Palma, Filipino news anchorwoman.
- April 18 – Ricardo Fortaleza, Filipino-Australian Olympic amateur boxer/amateur boxing coach and boxing instructor.
- April 27 – Fredenil Castro, Filipino politician. (d. 2020)
- May 4 – Manuel Buising, screenwriter
- May 15 – Benny Abante, Filipino politician and pastor.
- May 22 – Edgardo Labella, Filipino politician (d. 2021)
- May 26 – Bogs Adornado, Filipino basketball player and coach.
- June 4 – Francis Arnaiz, basketball player
- June 29 – Billy Hinsche, musician (died 2021)
- July 1 – Florencio Miraflores, Filipino politician.
- July 10 – Romulo Valles, Archbishop of the Metropolitan Archdiocese of Davao
- July 22 – Marte Samson, Filipino basketball player
- August 3 – Aleem Said Ahmad Basher, Filipino-Muslim Alim, an active Islamic preacher, broadcaster, lecturer and Islamic consultant
- August 10 – Menggie Cobarrubias, Filipino actor (d. 2020)
- August 27 – Jocelyn Bolante, Filipino politician
- August 30 – Jim Paredes, Filipino musician, producer, educator, writer, photographer, television personality, workshop facilitator, and activist
- September 9 – Adelina Barrion, entomologist and geneticist (died 2010)
- September 29 – Mike Enriquez, Filipino radio and television newscaster (died 2023)
- October 3 – Hussin Ututalum Amin, Filipino politician, scholar and current mayor of Jolo
- October 8 – Jimmy Santos, Filipino actor, comedian, TV host and a basketball player.
- October 10 – Boboy Garovillo, member of the APO Hiking Society
- October 14 – Salvador Medialdea, executive secretary
- October 15 – Atoy Co, Filipino basketball player
- October 17 - Marissa Delgado, actress
- November 4 – Eugenio Torre, chess grandmaster
- November 8 – Basil Valdez, Filipino balladeer.
- November 10 – Lim Eng Beng, Filipino-Chinese professional basketball player (d. 2015)
- November 27 – Danilo Palomer Santiago, Filipino Eclectic painter, professor and Department Chair of University of Santo Tomas - College of Fine Arts and Design (UST-CFAD)
- November 30 – Jessup Bahinting, Filipino pilot
- December 5 - Zandro Zamora, Former Filipino Actor
- December 22 – Joey Lina, Filipino Politician

=== Unknown ===
- Rosauro "Uro" Q. Dela Cruz, actor, writer, and director (d. 2016)

== Deaths ==
- June 1 – José Alejandrino, general and senator (b. 1870)
- June 6 – Tomás Confesor, politician and governor of Iloilo (b. 1891)
- June 21 – Juan Cailles, commander (b. 1871)
- July 15 – Florentino Collantes, poet (b. 1896)
- September 28 – Guillermo Capadocia, one of the founders of Partido Komunista ng Pilipinas; labor leader (CLM, CLO); and a commander of Hukbong Mapagpalaya ng Bayan in the Visayas (b. 1909)
- October 7 – Asiong Salonga, gangster (b. 1924)
- October 23 – Fernando Poe, Sr., actor (b. 1916)
