= 1950 in the Philippines =

- Decades: 1930s; 1940s; 1950s; 1960s; 1970s
- See also: List of years in the Philippines; films

1950 in the Philippines details events of note that happened in the Philippines in 1950.

== Incumbents ==
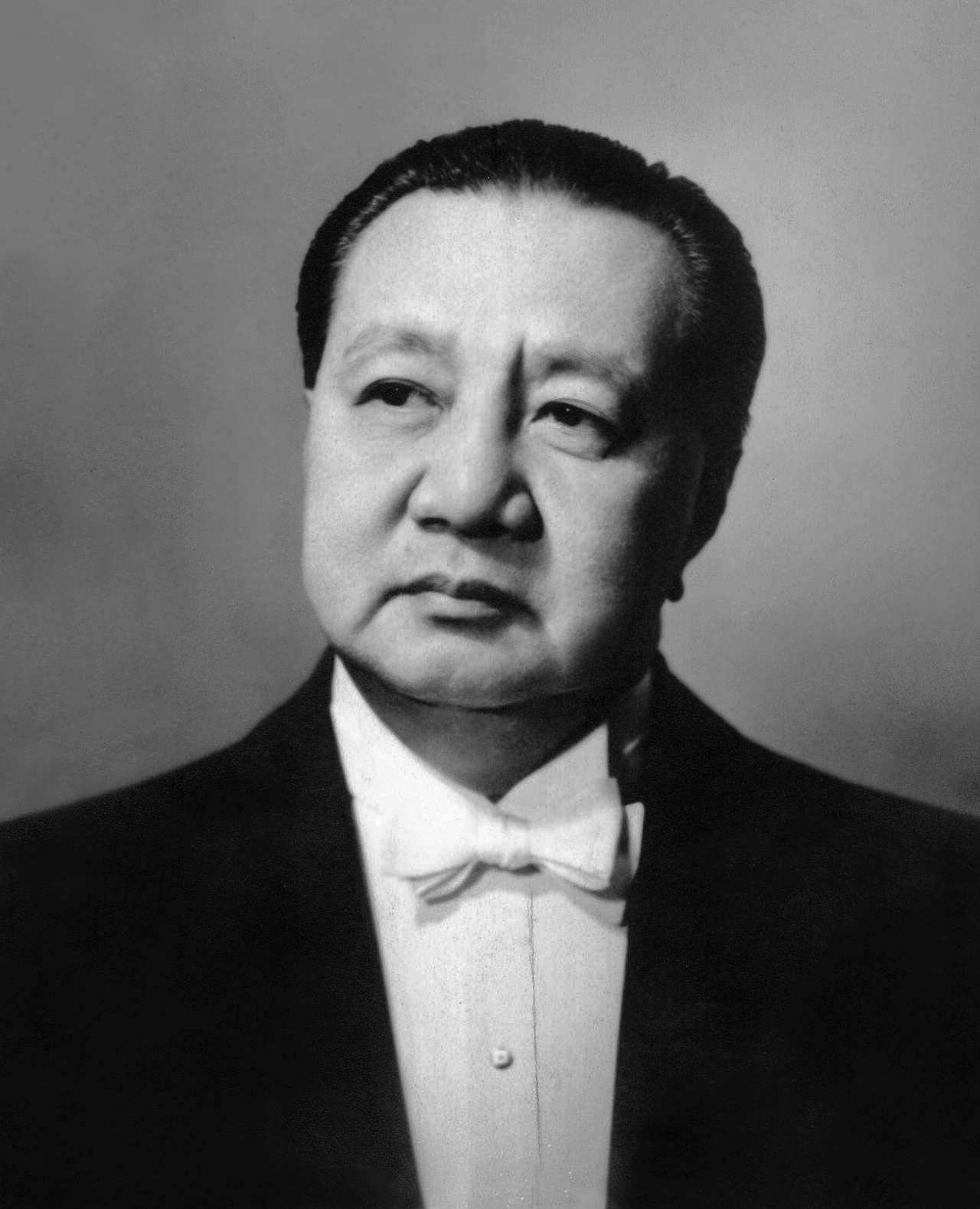
President Elpidio Quirino

- President: Elpidio Quirino (Liberal)
- Vice President: Fernando Lopez (Liberal)
- Chief Justice: Manuel Moran
- Congress: 2nd

== Events ==
=== January ===
- January 17 – Military chief of staff Maj. Gen. Mariano Castañeda and his companion escape an ambush in Quezon City, which kills his senior aide.

=== March ===
- March 28–April 3 – Coinciding with the anniversary of the 1942 establishment of the Hukbalahap on March 29, guerrillas under the said communist movement being renamed Hukbong Mapagpalaya ng Bayan (still commonly known as Huks) begin raids throughout Luzon. In the first three days, the Huks attack ten municipalities, particularly in Rizal, Laguna and Pampanga. Until April 1, they would kill 44 individuals including 35 from the government side, and capture a mayor and 12 policemen. Overall, two towns are burned and up to $1.5 million properties are looted. In early April, following a government order for the suppression of the Huks, the latter also raid San Clemente, Aparri and Santa Rosa.

=== April ===
- April 6 – All 28 soldiers belonging to a Philippine Constabulary commando unit are killed in an ambush by rebels in Carmona, Cavite.
- April 7 (Good Friday) – Constabulary troops and special policemen kill 50–100 civilians and burn 130 houses in a raid in Bacolor, Pampanga. The incident, which would only be reported later to the Senate by Pablo Angeles David, is in revenge for the April 4 assassination of Pampanga special police chief by the Huks.
- April 14 – The Philippine Air Force pilots attack 27 small boats aboard a massive number of Huk guerrillas, crossing the Chico River at the northern Candaba Swamp near the Pampanga–Nueva Ecija provincial boundary. Authorities estimate that 80% of the rebels—probably 320—are killed in what might be the deadliest single encounter in the Huk conflict.

=== June ===
- June 15 – Cagayan de Oro in the province of Misamis Oriental becomes a city through Republic Act 521 and ratified on the same day.
- June 16 – Iligan becomes a city in the province of Lanao del Norte through Republic Act 525 and ratified on the same day.

=== July ===
- July 24 – Cabanatuan becomes a city in the province of Nueva Ecija through Republic Act 526 and ratified on the same day.

=== August ===
- August 2 – Butuan becomes a city in the province of Agusan del Norte through Republic Act 523 and ratified on the same day.
- August 25–26 – Huk forces conduct simultaneous offensives throughout Luzon, with hundreds of members raiding eleven municipalities in five provinces and killing 150 people.
  - About 200 Huks conduct an evening raid of Tarlac, Tarlac, release prisoners, (Note: Reports on freed prisoners in Tarlac, Tarlac vary: Reuters news report: 48 are from the municipal jail; Court records: 33 from the provincial jail; 1986 publication: 17 Huks from Camp Macabulos) burn several buildings, and attack Camp Macabulos. In the said military camp, a separate band with two squadrons kills 13 army personnel, 9 civilians, and a Red Cross nurse; loots and burns all facilities. The attack causes a fighting until the next day; additional fatalities are reported. (Note: Reports on deaths in Tarlac, Tarlac vary: Reuters news report: 30 constabulary members and 25 Huks; 1986 publication: 17 civilians are also killed by Huks in Camp Macabulos)
  - On August 26, about 300–400 Huks launch an early morning raid of Santa Cruz, Laguna, loot the provincial capitol and even burn buildings, release 20 prisoners and kidnap 9 guards from the provincial jail, and kill at least seven—including three policemen; (Note: Court records state that Huks either kill or wound four civilians and 19 Army personnel in Santa Cruz, Laguna.) a battle ensues as Huks destroy two bridges in neighboring towns.
  - Similar attacks are conducted in Arayat, Ragay and Santo Domingo.

=== September ===
- September 4 – The publicized Uichanco report reveals the abuses by the commanders of the army and the constabulary in central Luzon. This leads to the reorganization of the entire army by the Department of National Defense (DND), where former Zambales representative Ramon Magsaysay has been serving as its secretary since three days prior after the resignation of Ruperto Kangleon on August 31.
- September 30 – Marawi becomes a city in the province of Lanao del Norte through Republic Act 592 and ratified on the same day.

=== October ===
- October 18 – Combined forces of the Military Intelligence Service and the Manila Police Department launch 22 simultaneous raids, resulting to the capture of the entire Huk Politburo in the city.
- October 22 – President Quirino issues Proclamation No. 210, suspending the writ of habeas corpus until the end of the anti-Huk campaign, allowing the detention of captured guerrillas for more than a day regardless of presence of any evidence. This will be affirmed by a trial court through a November 1 order.

=== November ===
- November 15 – The province of Mindoro is dissolved after splitting into two provinces. The provinces of Occidental Mindoro and Oriental Mindoro are founded through the date of effectivity of Proclamation No. 186.

=== December ===
- December 15 – An agrarian program in the Commonwealth era is reestablished by defense secretary Magsaysay as the Economic Development Corps, a civil resettlement project providing settlements in Mindanao mainly for the Huks, beginning efforts for ending the military campaign against the insurgents.
- December 23 or 29 – The DND places the Philippine Constabulary under the control of the Philippine Army in relation to the ongoing campaign against the Huks.

== Holidays ==
As per Act No. 2711 section 29, issued on March 10, 1917, any legal holiday of fixed date falls on Sunday, the next succeeding day shall be observed as legal holiday. Sundays are also considered legal religious holidays. Bonifacio Day was added through Philippine Legislature Act No. 2946. It was signed by then-Governor General Francis Burton Harrison in 1921. On October 28, 1931, the Act No. 3827 was approved declaring the last Sunday of August as National Heroes Day.

- January 1 – New Year's Day
- February 22 – Legal Holiday
- April 6 – Maundy Thursday
- April 7 – Good Friday
- May 1 – Labor Day
- July 4 – Philippine Republic Day
- August 13 – Legal Holiday
- August 27 – National Heroes Day
- November 22 – Thanksgiving Day
- November 30 – Bonifacio Day
- December 25 – Christmas Day
- December 30 – Rizal Day

== Births ==
- January 10 – Nicanor Perlas, Filipino activist
- January 29 – Rody Lacap, Filipino cinematographer
- February 1 – Romulo Neri, Filipino educator and public servant
- February 20 – Libran N. Cabactulan, Filipino diplomat from the Republic of the Philippines,
- February 28 – Jaime Fabregas, Filipino multi-awarded actor and musical scorer in the Philippines of Spanish descent.
- March 7 – Leo Martinez, Filipino actor/comedian and director.
- March 10 – Billy Bibit, Filipino retired colonel (died 2009)
- March 18 – Celeste Legaspi, Filipino singer and actress.
- March 19 – Jose S. Palma, Archbishop of Cebu
- March 23 – Roy Alvarez, filmmaker (died 2014)
- March 25 – Elpidio Barzaga, Jr., Filipino politician and Governor of Cavite
- April 5 – Agnes Devanadera, Filipino politician
- April 12 – Ricky Reyes, Hairdresser
- April 25 – Apollo C. Quiboloy, founder and leader of the Philippines-based Restorationist church, the Kingdom of Jesus Christ, The Name Above Every Name, Inc.
- May 16 – Mike Bigornia Filipino poet, editor, fictionist and translator.
- May 18 – Butch Ramirez, sports official
- June 5 – Abraham Sarmiento, Jr., Filipino student journalist (died 1977)
- June 20 - Prospero Pichay, Jr., Philippine politician
- July 13 – Abdusakur Mahail Tan, Filipino politician
- July 29 – Cynthia Villar, Filipino politician
- August 27 – Pen Medina, Filipino actor
- August 31 – Rey Paz Contreras, Filipino artist (d. 2021)
- September 11 – Jovito Palparan, Filipino retired Army general, and anti-communist.
- September 23 – Saidamen Balt Pangarungan, businessman, lawyer, and politician.
- October 10 – Roberto Cajes, Filipino politician
- October 12 – Pilar Pilapil, Filipino actress and Binibining Pilipinas Universe 1967
- October 22 – Velma Veloria
- October 24 – Iggy Arroyo, Filipino politician. (died 2012)
- October 31 – Antonio Taguba, retired major general in the United States Army.
- November 16 – Manuel Zamora - Filipino Politician
- December 2 – Maximo Junta, Filipino cyclist.
- December 10 – Leo Soriano, bishop of the United Methodist Church

=== Unknown ===
- Oscar Hilman, Filipino American brigadier general
- Quinito Henson, Filipino sports analyst

== Death ==
- May 28 - Vicente Sotto, Filipino politician and former senator of the Philippines (born 1877)
