= Said Ahmad Basher =

Filipino Islamic scholar, preacher, and broadcaster

Aleem Said Ahmad Basher سيد أحمد بشير
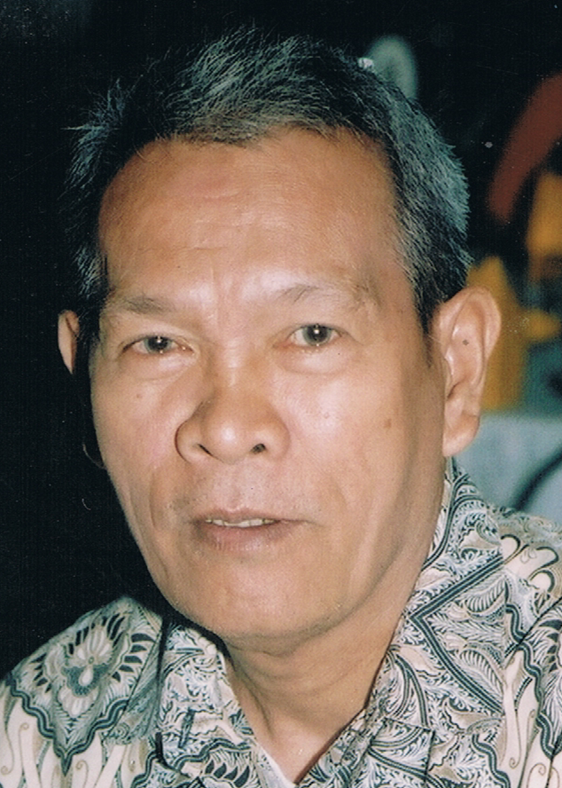
- Born: August 3, 1951 (age 75); Mecca, Saudi Arabia
- Died: April 3, 2024 (aged 72); Philippine General Hospital, Manila
- Resting place: Montalban Islamic Cemetery
- Citizenship: Filipino
- Education: Al-Azhar University (1994); Manuel L. Quezon University (MBA 1983) (B.S. 1975)
- Spouse: Saidah "Candac" Sambarani

Said Ahmad Basher (Arabic: سيد أحمد بشير; August 3, 1951 – April 3, 2024) is a Filipino Islamic scholar, an active Islamic preacher, broadcaster, lecturer and Islamic consultant. He is the current chair of the Imam Council of the Philippines. A Muslim leader and Imam, who tends to the community development, social needs, and spiritual guidance of Filipino Muslims, specifically those living in the Islamic communities in Metro Manila and nearby provinces in Luzon.

Bashar was chairman of Integrated Movement Access on Moonsighting (IMAM), an organization that discusses moon sightings for the purpose of completing Muslim rituals during the months of Ramadan and Dhu al-Hijjah. He was a member of reputed international moonsighting group Moonsighting Committee Worldwide (MCW).

Said is known to be grateful and different even dissimilar in faith. His active participation in various groups nationwide made him recognized in many organizations. He was quoted saying that the "ulama conference would resolve the problem of disunity among the ranks of the ulama" during the recent first National Ulama Consultative Conference; which was held in Cebu organized by the National Commission on Muslim Filipinos. He was also one of the 32 of the country's top Islamic clerics (ulama) who support the administration of President Benigno S. Aquino III's peace processes with Muslim rebel organizations.

== Personal life and education ==
In 1951, Said was born in Makkah, to Ahmad Bashir and Zinab of the Maranao ethnic group. He was the second child and son among five children of Ahmad with his first wife. Because of his passion for the Islamic way of life, like his father, Said decided to pursue a bachelor's degree in Islamic Propagation at Al-Azhar University in Cairo, Egypt, from which he graduated in 1994.

== Death ==
Speculation surrounding Said's health began circulating in early March 2024 after he was unable to actively join the moon sighting at the beginning of Ramadan in 2024; however, his friend retired Police Colonel Ebra Moxir said his illness was due to old age and heart problems.

== Social and missionary ==
=== Islamic viewpoint ===
Said adheres to the Sunni branch of Islam. He is an anti-abortion and a peace advocate. He denounces terrorism and describes violence in every form as "un-Islamic" and says that a real and true Muslim does not hurt innocent people.

=== Interfaith dialogue ===
In 2005, a group of Maranao entrepreneurs living in Manila elected Aleem Said as vice-president of the Manila Muslim Chamber of Commerce, though, he is not involved in any such businesses. In 2010, Said, being a peace advocator for more than a decade, successfully convened the Philippines Interfaith Leaders Forum; an innovative step he perceived as an interfaith initiative expert, during his tenure as a member of the board of directors at Peacemakers' Circle Foundation. The Peacemakers’ Circle was founded in July 1998 by Marites Guingona-Africa, niece of former Vice-president Teofisto Guingona. He is actively involved in interfaith dialogue, whether in the private or public sector. He's quoted saying “Our collective prayers are the best thing that we can do as a nation to bolster the diplomatic efforts and representation of our government before the Government of China to save the lives of the three Filipinos,” as a response to the President's appeal during the wake of the conviction of jailed workers.

Said also served as a spiritual consultant during the recent National Forum on Zakat held at the SMX Convention Center. Paying zakat is one of Five Pillars of Islam. He explains that Quran has named the eight kinds of persons who should receive zakah, such as the Masako (destitute); fuqaraa (the needy or poor); amil' Zakah (the alms collectors); VI sabi `Tillah (in the path of God); gharimun (people burdened with debt); ibn as-Sabi l (the wayfarers); Riyadh (people in bondage or slavery); and mu'Allaf (those who have inclined towards Islam). He also gives spiritual guidance on every before, during, and after of the two Eids. In Ramadan, he cited the importance of adhering to the Sunnah of Islam's prophet. He also emphasized that Eid’l Fitr was also a day for visiting relatives and friends and for making reconciliation. In Dhu al-Hijjah, Aleem Said explained that Eid al-Adha symbolizes to the obedience of Prophet Ibrahim and his son Ismail as commanded by Allah, it represents the prayer for peace not only among Muslims but in unity and love of mankind that worship God. The Eid means festival and adha means sacrifice.

== TV Appearance ==
Year	Network	Program	Role	Other notes
2011	ABS-CBN	Patrol ng Pilipino	Himself – Guest	Episode dated August 30
2011	TV5	News5	Himself – Guest	Episode dated August 21
2011	GMA	GMA News TV	Himself – Guest	Live interview (dated August 30)

== See also ==
- Sheikh Ahmad Bashir, founder of Jamiatu Muslim Mindanao
