= 1954 in the Philippines =

- Decades: 1930s; 1940s; 1950s; 1960s; 1970s
- See also: List of years in the Philippines; films

1954 in the Philippines details events of note that happened in the Philippines in 1954.

== Incumbents ==
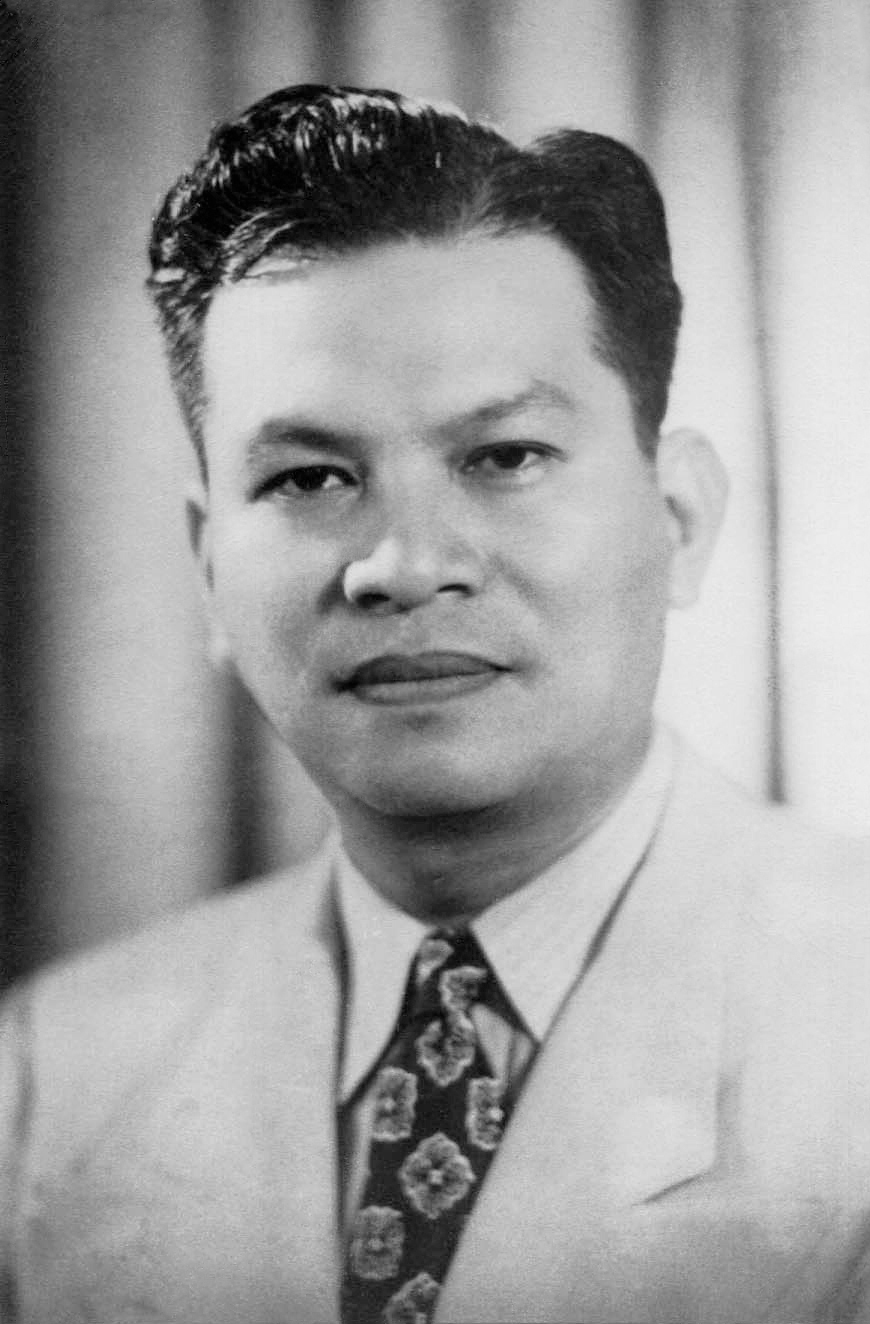
President Ramon Magsaysay

- President: Ramon Magsaysay (Nacionalista Party)
- Vice President: Carlos P. Garcia (Nacionalista Party)
- Chief Justice: Ricardo Paras
- Congress: 3rd (starting January 25)

== Events ==
=== May ===
- 1 May–9 May – The Asian Games take place in Manila.

=== July ===
- July 21 – The Southeast Asia Collective Defense Treaty is signed in Manila, creating the South East Asian Treaty Organization (SEATO).
- July 24 – Blesilda Ocampo is placed Top 15 of Miss Universe 1954 at Long Beach, California, USA. She is the first Filipina finalist.

=== September ===
- September 2 – A timber train carrying more than 100 passengers derailed and multiple wagons fall off a bridge near Fabrica, Negros Occidental. At least 82 people were killed.

=== December ===
- December 15 – The Laurel-Langley Agreement is signed.

== Holidays ==
As per Act No. 2711 section 29, issued on March 10, 1917, any legal holiday of fixed date falls on Sunday, the next succeeding day shall be observed as legal holiday. Sundays are also considered legal religious holidays. Bonifacio Day was added through Philippine Legislature Act No. 2946. It was signed by then-Governor General Francis Burton Harrison in 1921. On October 28, 1931, the Act No. 3827 was approved declaring the last Sunday of August as National Heroes Day.

- January 1 – New Year's Day
- February 22 – Legal Holiday
- April 15 – Maundy Thursday
- April 16 – Good Friday
- May 1 – Labor Day
- July 4 – Philippine Republic Day
- August 13 – Legal Holiday
- August 29 – National Heroes Day
- November 25 – Thanksgiving Day
- November 30 – Bonifacio Day
- December 25 – Christmas Day
- December 30 – Rizal Day

== Sports ==
- May 8 – The Asian Football Confederation (AFC) is formed in Manila, Philippines.

== Births ==
- January 14 – Ramon S. Ang, Filipino businessman
- January 15 – Jose Dalisay, Jr., Filipino writer
- February 21 – Carl Benito, politician
- March 6 – Chanda Romero, actress
- April 26 – Chito S. Roño, Filipino director
- April 28 – Vic Sotto, Filipino actor, television show host, comedian, and film producer
- April 29 – Josephine Sato, Filipino politician
- May 4:
  - Rey Valera, Filipino singer
  - Ryan Cayabyab, Filipino conductor, musician, and composer
- May 23 – Menardo Guevarra, lawyer, public servant, and Secretary of Justice
- May 25 – Emilia Boncodin, accountant, professor, and public servant (d. 2010)
- June 30 – Boy Logro, chef
- July 5:
  - Datu Yusoph Boyog Mama, Filipino diplomat
  - Rolando Uy, Filipino politician
- July 13 – Florencio Abad, Filipino lawyer and politician.
- July 17 – Elizabeth Oropesa, Filipino actress
- July 28 – Bernie Fabiosa, Filipino professional basketball player and actor
- August 20 – Manny Castañeda, Filipino actor and director (d. 2024)
- August 23 – Danny L. Mandia, father of modern Filipino dubbing (d. 2024)
- August 26 – Efren Reyes, OLD, PLH, Filipino professional pool player
- August 29 – Neptali Gonzales II, Filipino lawmaker
- September 8 – Edgar Mortiz, Filipino actor and director
- September 10 – Victoria Hernandez-Reyes, Filipino politician
- September 22:
  - Rene Villanueva, Filipino author published in the Philippines (d. 2007)
  - Michael Marcos Keon, Filipino politician.
- September 28 – Tata Esteban, Filipino producer-director. (d. 2003)
- October 12 – Wilfredo Caminero, Filipino politician
- October 18 – John F. Du, Catholic archbishop
- October 28 – Mike Rama, Filipino politician
- October 31 – Rey Aquino, Filipino politician
- November 1 – Susan Fuentes, Filipino singer (d. 2013)
- December 26 – Hajji Alejandro, Filipino singer and actor (d. 2025)

== Deaths ==
- June 27 - Alfredo Versoza, Filipino Catholic Church (b. 1877)
