= Agama Islam Society =

Islamic organization based in the Philippines

- Formation: 1956
- Headquarters: Marawi, Lanao del Sur, Philippines

The Agama Islam Society is a consultative council of Islamic scholars that are based in Marawi, Philippines. The basis in instituting the society is to act as an assembly in the establishment of Islamic faith in 1956. The society was organized and led by late Sheikh Ahmad Bashir in 1955. Its governing body consists of fifteen members called Shura Council which is based on shura.

The society has helped established various madrasahs, and the notable one is Jamiatu Muslim Mindanao. In 2004, these madrasahs were mainstreamed in 16 regions nationwide mainly in Muslim areas in Mindanao, under the auspices and program of the Department of Education.

== See also ==
- Islam in the Philippines
