= 1952 in the Philippines =

- Decades: 1930s; 1940s; 1950s; 1960s; 1970s
- See also: List of years in the Philippines; films

1952 in the Philippines details events of note that happened in the Philippines in 1952.

== Incumbents ==
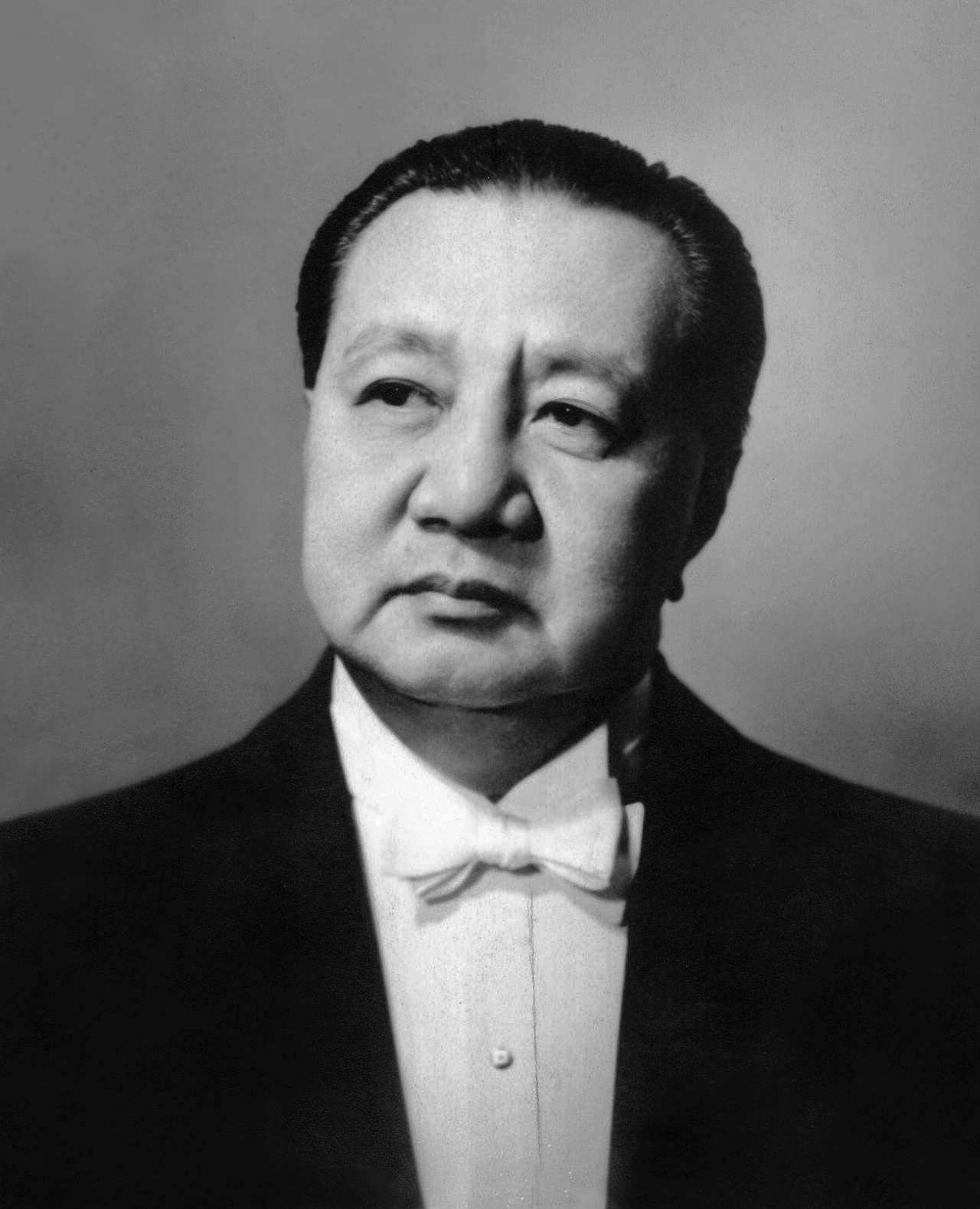
President Elpidio Quirino

- President: Elpidio Quirino (Liberal)
- Vice President: Fernando Lopez (Liberal)
- Chief Justice: Ricardo Paras
- Congress: 2nd

== Events ==
=== January–March ===
- February 14 – The Gallego EDCOR farm in Buldon, Cotabato, the second EDCOR project, is opened.

=== April–June ===
- April 10 – Operation Four Roses, a counter-insurgency campaign whose main objective is to neutralize the four ranking leaders of the communist organization Hukbong Mapagpalaya ng Bayan (HMB; commonly known as Huks)—Luis Taruc, Jesus Lava, Alfredo Saulo, and Jose de Leon (Kumander Dimasalang), begins. The month-long operation by the Philippine Army will end with the deaths of 17 Huks and five soldiers, and the capture of nine Huks, although none of the main targets are among them.
- April 11 – During the Operation Four Roses, two ranking Huk department members, William J. Pomeroy, an American and also the propaganda chief, and his wife Celia Mariano, along with up to 30 companions, are arrested by the army in a raid at a part of Sierra Madre in Papaya, Nueva Ecija, near its boundaries with the provinces of Bulacan and Quezon. (Note: Multiple citations (Pomeroy's arrest); with mentions of any of these: W. Pomeroy only; W. Pomeroy and C. Mariano; Companions: 15 (along with Pomeroy); two commanders and 28 followers (along with the two))
- June 6 – The province of Zamboanga is divided into two—Zamboanga del Norte and Zamboanga del Sur, the latter includes Basilan and Zamboanga cities for the purpose of district representation, by virtue of Republic Act No. 711 which is enacted at the same day.

=== July–September ===
- July 31 – Moro bandit leader Hadji Kamlon, believed by the national government already dead, appears and formally surrenders at Lahing-Lahing Beach (then under the jurisdiction of Luuk, Sulu).
- August – The Philippine Army conducts an offensive against the Huks in the mountains of Zambales. The operation ends after 72 days with 72 of the estimated 200 guerrillas neutralized.

=== October–December ===
- October 21–22 – A typhoon hits southern Luzon, killing 443 (as of October 24). Albay was the worst-hit province with 118 deaths reported in Tabaco.
- December 15 – A river breaks through a gold mine in Paracale, Camarines Norte, causing it to collapse and engulfing 55 individuals in then the country's deadliest mining disaster.

== Holidays ==
As per Act No. 2711 section 29, issued on March 10, 1917, any legal holiday of fixed date falls on Sunday, the next succeeding day shall be observed as legal holiday. Sundays are also considered legal religious holidays. Bonifacio Day was added through Philippine Legislature Act No. 2946. It was signed by then-Governor General Francis Burton Harrison in 1921. On October 28, 1931, the Act No. 3827 was approved declaring the last Sunday of August as National Heroes Day.

- January 1 – New Year's Day
- February 22 – Legal Holiday
- March 29 – Maundy Thursday
- March 30 – Good Friday
- May 1 – Labor Day
- July 4 – Philippine Republic Day
- August 13 – Legal Holiday
- August 26 – National Heroes Day
- November 22 – Thanksgiving Day
- November 30 – Bonifacio Day
- December 25 – Christmas Day
- December 30 – Rizal Day

== Births ==
- July 10 – Evelio Leonardia, politician
