= 1949 in the Philippines =

- Decades: 1920s; 1930s; 1940s; 1950s; 1960s
- See also: List of years in the Philippines; films

1949 in the Philippines details events of note that happened in the Philippines in 1949.

== Incumbents ==
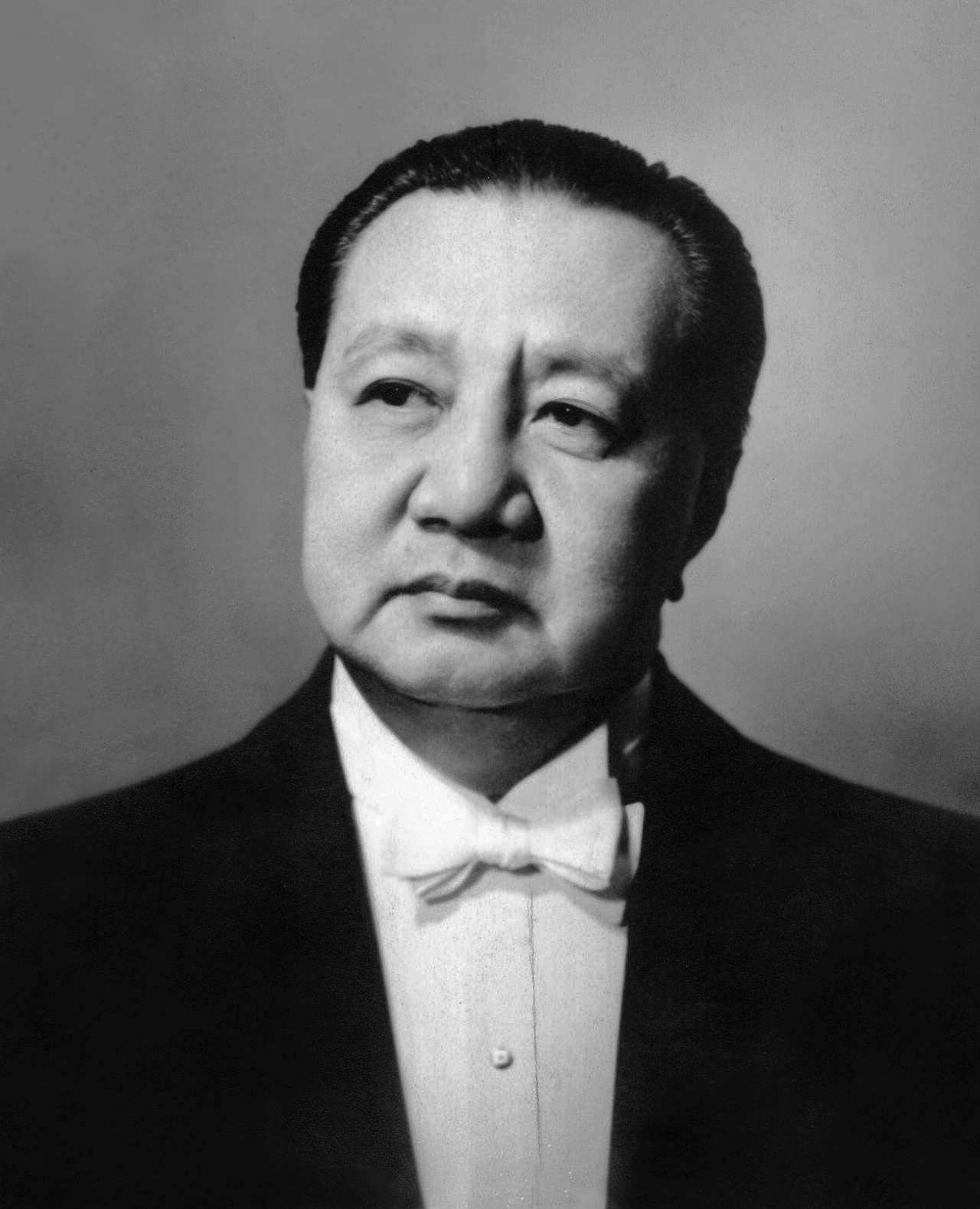
President Elpidio Quirino

- President: Elpidio Quirino (Liberal)
- Vice President:
  - Vacant (until December 30)
  - Fernando Lopez (Liberal) (starting December 30)
- Chief Justice: Manuel Moran
- Congress:
  - 1st (until December 13)
  - 2nd (starting December 30)

== Events ==
=== January–March ===
- February 21 – Jose Avelino is ousted as the Senate president, in one of the events that lead to the splitting of the ruling Liberal Party (LP).
- March 21 – The Philippine Air Force conducts what would be the first reported strafing raid on a several hundred communist Huk peasants on the Sierra Madre mountains of central Luzon, killing 30 guerrillas.

=== April–June ===
- April 28 – Sixteen individuals are killed in two ambush incidents in Nueva Ecija. In Bongabon, communist guerrillas—Hukbong Mapagpalaya ng Bayan (HMB; formerly Hukbalahap and is commonly called Huks) commander Alexander Viernes and his 200 men—ambush a 12-vehicle motorcade on its way to Baler, Quezon, on the Sierra Madre, killing 12 including former First Lady Aurora Quezon, her daughter, a Quezon City mayor, and constabulary troops. Maj. Gen. Rafael Jalandoni, former military chief, is among those injured.
- May 7 – A Philippine Airlines C-47 with Daet–Manila flight route explodes in mid-air; all 13 persons on board are reported killed, with only a body later recovered, along with the plane's debris at Alabat Island. The explosion is later revealed being caused by a time bomb which has been planted by a couple. At least four suspects are arrested.
- June 1 – Eleven guerrillas are killed by government forces in an Huk outpost on a camp in the Sierra Madre. The following day, the base-camp near Mount Guiniat, which turns out to be "Stalin University", is captured; 37 more Huks are killed in the ensuing week-long operation. Since May, joint Constabulary and Army forces have been pursuing Huks involved in the ambush of Quezon's group.

=== July–September ===
- The country's new civil code is enacted, and would be effective by 1950. The law abolishes divorce and allows legal separation instead.
- September 11 – Huk commander Alexander Viernes is killed by the Philippine Army near Kangkong in the Sierra Madre, following a two-month search, ending the four-month operation with an entire Huk regional command dismantled, 146 insurgents killed and 40 more captured. The death toll might be higher as the constabulary has estimated this at 500 by late July.
- September 20 – War veteran Brig. Gen. Carlos Romulo is elected president of the United Nations General Assembly at the beginning of its fourth session in Lake Success, New York.

=== October–December ===
- October 31 – The date, which has been set by the national government, as the deadline for the evacuation of persons in an International Refugee Organization (IRO) refugee camp in Sturbabao Island off Samar, which has been established in February and houses more than 5,000 people. By late November, there are still 3,800, mostly white Russians, in the said resettlement camp.
- November 1–3 – Visayas is hit within two days by what would be the worst typhoon in 12 years before leaving for South China Sea. Damages are estimated at $25 million. Affected islands are Cebu, where a 100-mph wind is the worst in 37 years, and 15 people are killed; and Negros, where 200 additional deaths are reported, and Panay being stricken 12 hours earlier than forecast. The Philippine Red Cross reports 201 deaths and 461 missing persons, as of November 7.
- November 8 – The first presidential election under the post-colonial republic is held, with a four-year presidency, third of the Senate with a 6-year term, and the 97-seat House of Representatives with a 4-year term, being at stake. Incumbent president Quirino of the LP successfully defends his seat against former president Jose P. Laurel of the Nacionalista Party and former Senate president Avelino who has founded an LP faction; his new term will start on December 30.
- November 26 – The national government formally rejects a request by the IRO for an extension for settling political refugees from China encamped in the country.
- December 15 – Fifteen constabulary personnel are slain by Moro bandits in an ambush on Mount Luuk in Jolo island, Sulu. There are 25–62 more being presumed dead.

== Holidays ==
As per Act No. 2711 section 29, issued on March 10, 1917, any legal holiday of fixed date falls on Sunday, the next succeeding day shall be observed as legal holiday. Sundays are also considered legal religious holidays. Bonifacio Day was added through Philippine Legislature Act No. 2946. It was signed by then-Governor General Francis Burton Harrison in 1921. On October 28, 1931, the Act No. 3827 was approved declaring the last Sunday of August as National Heroes Day.

- January 1 – New Year's Day
- February 22 – Legal Holiday
- April 9 - Day of Valor
- April 14 - Maundy Thursday
- April 15 - Good Friday
- April 16 - Black Saturday
- April 17 - Easter Sunday
- May 1 – Labor Day
- July 4 – Philippine Republic Day
- August 13 – Legal Holiday
- August 26 – National Heroes Day-->
- November 22 – Thanksgiving Day
- November 30 – Bonifacio Day
- December 25 – Christmas Day
- December 30 – Rizal Day

== Births ==
- January 2 - Samuel Martires, Former Ombudsman and former Associate Justice of the Supreme Court of the Philippines
- May 24 - Val Iglesias, Actor Stuntman Film Director and Writer
- July 6 – Noli de Castro, journalist and politician
- September 17 – Didith Reyes, actress and singer (d. 2008)
- September 26 - Francis Jardeleza, Former Associate Justice of the Supreme Court of the Philippines.
- October 18 - Lucas Bersamin, Former Executive Secretary of the Philippines
- October 20 - Gina Pareño, Actress
- October 26 – Antonio Carpio, chief justice and Lead Convenor 1Sambayan
- October 31 - Liza Lorena, actress
- December 13 - Manny Villar, Businessman and former President of the Senate of the Philippines

== Deaths ==
- April 28:
  - Among those killed in the Bongabon incident:
    - Aurora Aragon–Quezon, former First Lady
    - Ponciano Bernardo, mayor of Quezon City
    - Col. Primitivo San Agustin, chief of the army intelligence service
    - Maj. Antonio San Agustin, assistant manager of the Philippine Charity Sweepstakes Office
  - David Ventura, mayor of Santa Rosa, Nueva Ecija
- August 17 – Gregorio Perfecto, journalist and jurist (b. 1891)
