= 1953 in the Philippines =

- Decades: 1930s; 1940s; 1950s; 1960s; 1970s
- See also: List of years in the Philippines; films

1953 in the Philippines details events of note that happened in the Philippines in the year 1953

== Incumbents ==
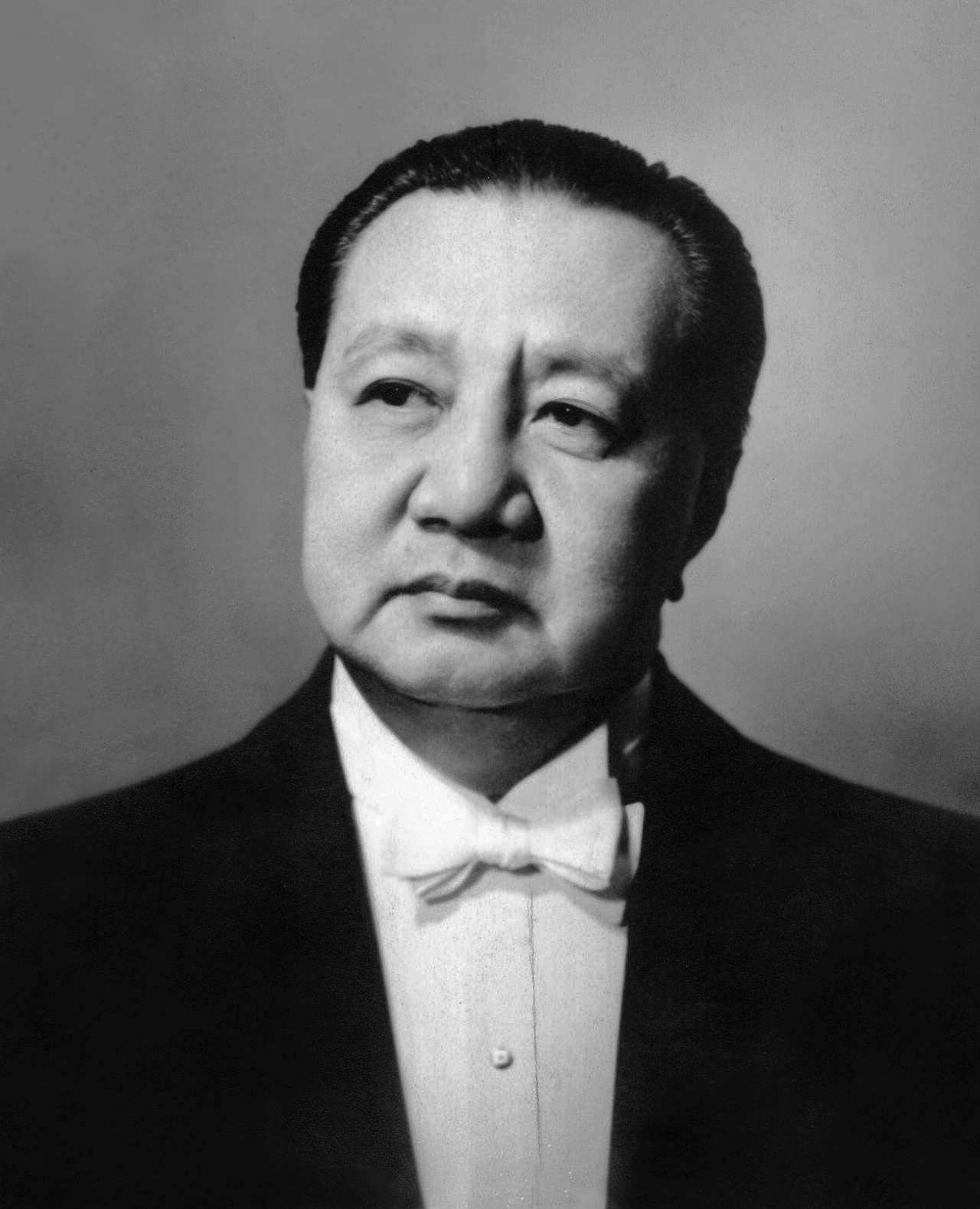
Outgoing President Elpidio Quirino

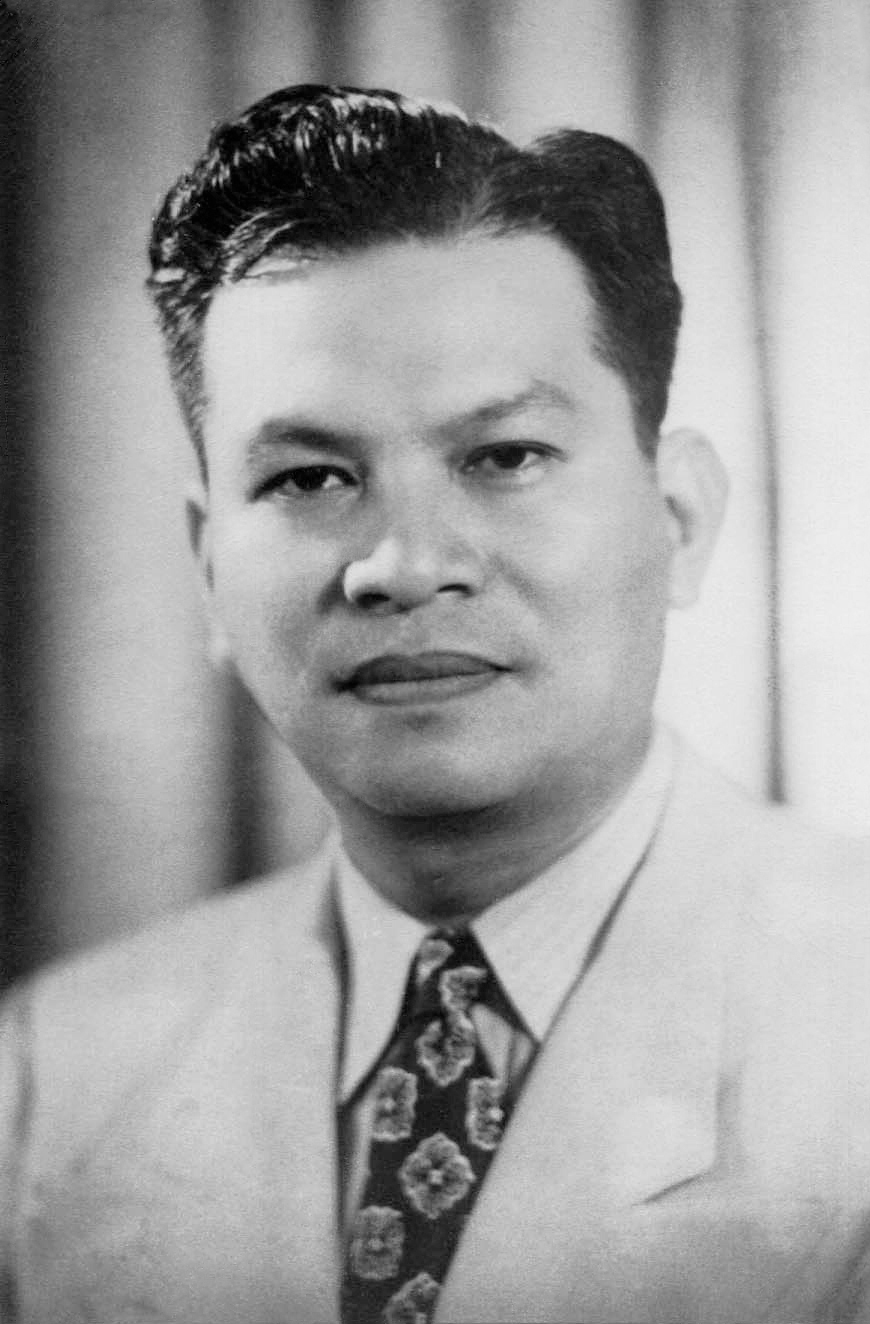
Incoming President Ramon Magsaysay

- President:
  - Elpidio Quirino (Liberal) (until December 30)
  - Ramon Magsaysay (Nacionalista Party) (starting December 30)
- Vice President:
  - Fernando Lopez (Liberal) (until December 30)
  - Carlos P. Garcia (Nacionalista Party) (starting December 30)
- Chief Justice: Ricardo Paras
- Congress: 2nd (until December 8)

== Events ==
=== June ===
- June 12 – Tacloban becomes a city in the province of Leyte through Republic Act 760.

=== November ===
- November 10 – Ramon Magsaysay is elected president in the presidential elections.

=== December ===
- December 30 – Magsaysay takes his oath of office.

== Holidays ==
As per Act No. 2711 section 29, issued on March 10, 1917, any legal holiday of fixed date falls on Sunday, the next succeeding day shall be observed as legal holiday. Sundays are also considered legal religious holidays. Bonifacio Day was added through Philippine Legislature Act No. 2946. It was signed by then-Governor General Francis Burton Harrison in 1921. On October 28, 1931, the Act No. 3827 was approved declaring the last Sunday of August as National Heroes Day.

- January 1 – New Year's Day
- February 22 – Legal Holiday
- April 2 – Maundy Thursday
- April 3 – Good Friday
- May 1 – Labor Day
- July 4 – Philippine Republic Day
- August 13 – Legal Holiday
- August 30 – National Heroes Day
- November 26 – Thanksgiving Day
- November 30 – Bonifacio Day
- December 25 – Christmas Day
- December 30 – Rizal Day

== Entertainment and culture ==
- October 23 – The Philippines' DZAQ-TV 3 of Alto Broadcasting System (now ABS-CBN) makes its initial telecast, becoming Asia's first commercial television broadcaster.

== Births ==
- January 5 – Tony Tan Caktiong, Filipino entrepreneur
- January 7 – Flor Contemplacion, Filipino domestic worker executed in Singapore (d. 1995)
- January 27 – Dinky Soliman, politician and Secretary of DSWD (d. 2021)
- February 13 – Rico J. Puno, singer and politician (d. 2018)
- March 14 – Leonard Mayaen, governor of Mountain Province (d. 2016)
- March 28 – Herminio Coloma Jr., Secretary of the Presidential Communications Operations Office
- April 10 – William Dar, horticulturist and public servant
- April 20 – Cielito Habito, economist, professor, and columnist
- May 21 – Nora Aunor, Filipina actress and singer (d. 2025)
- May 24 – Ricardo Manapat, author and director of National Archives (d. 2008)
- May 27 – Coney Reyes, Filipina actress and host
- May 29 – Wendel Avisado, Secretary of Budget and Management
- August 10 – Menggie Cobarrubias, actor (d. 2020)
- August 11 – Cory Quirino, Filipino author, host, and national director of Miss World Philippines
- August 21 – Phillip Salvador, Filipino actor
- September 13 – Rufus Rodriguez, Filipino legal scholar and politician
- September 14 – Freddie Hubalde, basketball player
- September 15 – Margarita Moran-Floirendo, Miss Universe 1973
- September 20 – Roi Vinzon, Filipino action star
- September 28 - Andy Jao, PBA game analyst
- October 3 – Ramon Fernandez, basketball player
- November 5 – Florentino Floro, lawyer and judge
- November 11 – Narciso Villaver Abellana, Filipino Roman Catholic bishop
- November 20 – Bembol Roco, actor
- December 16 – Emmanuel Piñol, journalist, writer, agriculturist and politician
- December 27 – Gina Lopez, environmentalist, former DENR secretary (2016–2017), former chairperson of ABS-CBN Foundation (d. 2019)
