= Leo Soriano =

Filipino prelate of the United Methodist Church

Leo A. Soriano (born December 10, 1950) is a retired bishop of the United Methodist Church (U.M.) in the Philippines. He was elected in 2000 and held this position until 2012.

== Medical missionary ==
He reached out to ethnic groups and underserved communities in the provinces of Cotabato, Davao, Leyte, Samar, Sultan Kudarat, Zamboanga and Palawan. When Mt. Pinatubo erupted in 1992, he was working there with the Aetas ethnic groups of Zambales. He held that position until the project funded by the UM General Board of Global Ministries changed it to a Community-based Primary Health Care Program.

== Episcopal ministry ==
He served as the Resident Bishop of the Davao episcopal area, one of three episcopal areas of the Philippines, for 12 years (2000-2012). His offices were in the Spottswood Methodist Center in Kidapawan City. In 2004 he was appointed to a four-year position as one of four voting members of the General Council on Finance and Administration of the UM. He has served as a member of the UMC Council of Bishops, the UMC General Council on Ministries, and the cross denominational organizations Christian Conference of Asia and National Council of Churches in the Philippines.

He has acted as a spokesperson for UMC Philippines during the December 2003 typhoons and Southern Leyte mudslides and signing a Bible sent to President George W. Bush as congratulations following his re-election, a 200-year-old UMC tradition.

On November 24, 2008, Bishop Soriano was re-elected for a third term as Bishop of the UM and was reassigned to Davao Episcopal Area.

In 2010 he and several other Filipino clergy petitioned the US government to apply pressure on the Filipino government regarding their handling of human rights.

He retired from active service in December 2012 during the UM Philippine Central Conference at Bayombong, Nueva Vizcaya.

== Post-Episcopacy ==
Bishop Soriano teaches at the Southern Philippines Methodist Colleges in Kidapawan, Cotabato, and the Bishop Han Theological Seminary in Bukidnon.

== Advocacy ==
Soriano is one of the Filipino bishops that support an autonomous, affiliated relationship with the UM. His election is seen as an indication of the desire of the Filipino Methodists to be led by leaders who will move the Filipino UM a step closer to becoming autonomous.

He has also advocated for a harmonious living relationship among Christians and Muslims. The Bishop's office of the Davao Episcopal Area has been actively involved in the Christian-Muslim Dialogue that seeks to find ways and means to achieve peace in Mindanao.

In 2022, he was one of the signatories in the UM’s statement in response to gun violence in the US.

== See also ==
- List of bishops of the United Methodist Church
