= Fabrica train crash =

Train crash in the Philippines

Details
- Date: September 2, 1954; 16:13
- Location: Fabrica, Sagay, Negros Occidental
- Coordinates: 10°53′26″N 123°21′19″E
- Country: Philippines
- Cause: Derailment and fall off bridge

Statistics
- Trains: 1
- Passengers: Unknown
- Deaths: 82
- Injured: Unknown

A train crash occurred on September 2, 1954, near Fabrica, Negros Occidental, Philippines, on the Insular Lumber Company's logging railroad, when a timber train carrying more than 100 passengers pulled by 0-6-6-0 Mallet #7, "El Siete", derailed and multiple wagons fell off a bridge. At least 82 people were killed.
