= Ahmad Bashir (Islamic scholar) =

Filipino ulama

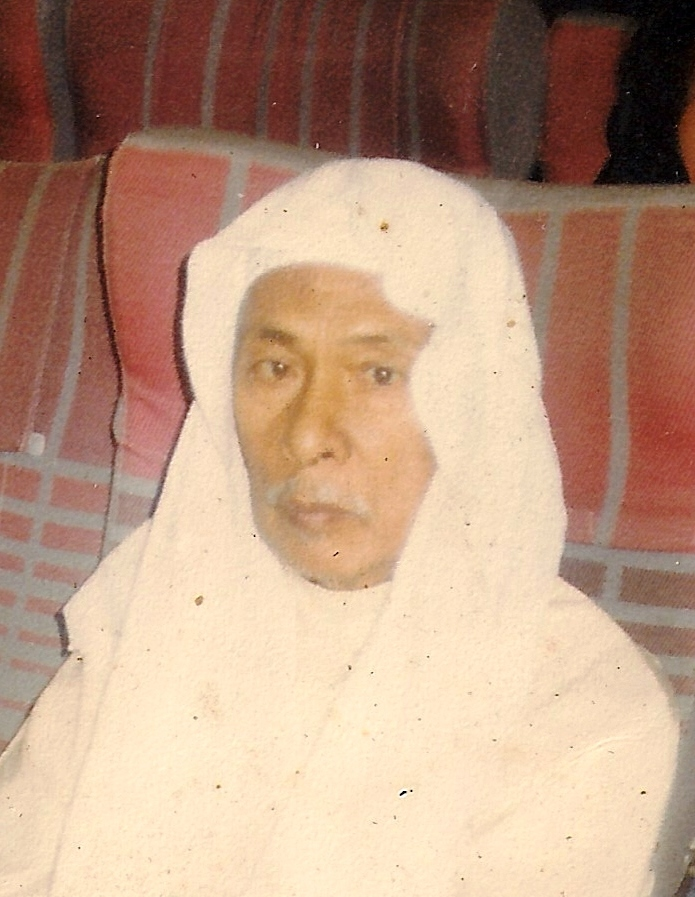
- Ahmad Bashir, 1988
- Born: 1 January 1919; Miondas, Tamparan, Lanao del Sur, Philippine Islands
- Died: 10 July 1989 (aged 70); Iligan, Lanao del Norte, Philippines
- Resting place: Grounds of the Jamiatu Muslim Mindanao, Marawi City, Lanao del Sur
- Citizenship: Filipino
- Spouses: Hadja Zinab (19??–19??); Hadja Aminah (19??–1994)

Ahmad bin Haji Bashir Mohammed Shafi (Arabic: أحمد بن حاجي بشير الشافي الشيخ Arabic pronunciation; January 1, 1919 – July 10, 1989) was a Filipino Muslim Islamic scholar, leader, teacher, and founding president of the Agama Islam Society. He was born on 1 January 1919, in Miondas, Tamparan, Lanao del Sur, Philippines.

== Election ==
Ahmad was nominated to run as a delegate for the lone district of Lanao del Sur to the Philippine Constitutional Convention of 1971 but lost.

== Education ==
=== Early childhood ===
Ahmad received his first non-formal education from his father, and then studied at the School of Islam to complete primary school in the city of Marawi.

=== Education in Mecca ===
In 1951, Ahmad traveled to the Hejaz to continue his education in Mecca. He joined the Al-Falah School in Makkah, a religious science school till he completed his studies in the year 1953, and later joined the Al-Soltiyyah School in the Grand Mosque also in Makkah. He was awarded a degree in Islamic Sciences, which was considered at that time the highest religious education at the Mosque.

== Missionary work ==
Ahmad went back to the Philippines after completing his studies. At first, he taught at an Islamic School in Marawi City. He helped create some of the schools in various communities with complete and organized conjunctions with some of his peers, and colleagues throughout the years till 1955.

In 1956, Ahmad and companions founded the Agama Islam Society, after the establishment of the Shoura Council. The Society founded Islamic schools, ultimately having 363 branches in all regions of the Philippines, visited by more than 5,000 students in the academic year 1986-1987.

=== Activities ===
In 1972, the Agama Islam Society transferred Ma’had Mindanao Al-Arabie Al-Islamie to Darussalam, Matampay, Marawi City, as the main campus through the assistance of Sheikh Esmail Laut Sarip and former Lanao del Sur Governor, Sultan sa Masiu, Hon. Mohammad Ali Dimaporo. After a certain portion of the land was excluded from the operation of Proclamation No. 453 dated December 23, 1953 which established the Amai Pakpak (former Camp Keithley) military reservation, embraced therein situated in Matampay, City of Marawi according to Proclamation No. 2223 signed by the Philippines President Ferdinand E. Marcos.

Sheikh Ahmad (Third from left) met His Excellency President Ferdinand E. Marcos at Malacañang Palace during the ratification of Proclamation No. 2223, the exclusion of around 10 hectares of land from military reservation for the benefit of the Jamiatu Muslim Mindanao.

As president of the Agama Islam Islam, Ahmad had been associated with various Islamic Associations in the Philippines and played a role in their creation. He was president of the National Union of Arab-Islamic Schools in the Philippines. President of the Local Council of Mosques in the Philippines. He attended international conferences with a theme of Islamic mission including the Kingdom of Saudi Arabia, Iraq, Malaysia, Pakistan, Qatar, Indonesia, Tunisia, Egypt & Others (from 1381 to 1406 Hijri).

He wrote thirteen books in the Philippines, including Islamic, Arabic, and Muslim history. His collection of Qur’an and Islamic Manuscripts has been cited multiple times around the world.

He was involved in:

- The establishment of the now-defunct Saudi and Philippines Publishing Center in 1980, Parañaque, Metro Manila, financed by King Khalid ibn Abdulaziz Al-Saud.
- The establishment of the Jamiatu Muslim Mindanao in 1987.
- The completion of Maranao translation of the Quran, which was reviewed by a committee of Maranao Scholars headed by Ahmad Bashir, and also Islamic manuscripts of Sheikh Ahmad collection.

Left to right: Former Senator Domocao Alonto, Sheikh Ahmad, and former ARMM Governor Lininding Pangandaman representing Muslims in the Philippines to one of the Muslim World League conferences in 1982, Makkah, Saudi Arabia.

Ahmad had closely worked both with NGO and government various organizations, agencies, leaders, such as former senator Domocao Alonto and former Philippines Ambassador to Saudi Arabia Lininding Pangandaman for the welfare of the Maranaos.

=== Agama Islam Society ===
The basis of the creation of the society was through a consultative council, of which some academicians were from Marawi City, under the chairmanship of Ahmad Bashir in the year 1375H (1955). This Council established the society to propagate Islam in 1956.

=== Death ===
After a prolonged battle with multiple health complications, Ahmad died on July 10, 1989.
