= Jamiatu Muslim Mindanao =

Private university in Marawi City, Philippines

- Type: Private sectarian basic and higher education institution
- Established: 1956; 70 years ago
- Founder: Sheikh Ahmad Bashir
- Academic affiliations: League of Islamic Universities, ARTVET, MINTVET
- President: Mahdi Ahmad Basher
- Students: c. 1,200
- Location: Marawi, Lanao del Sur, Philippines; 8°00′42″N 124°17′06″E
- Campus: JMM Campus:3 ha (7.4 acres)
- Medium of Instruction: Filipino, Maranao, English, Arabic
- Colors: Pink - White - Black
- Nickname: Matampay
- Website: www.jmm.edu.ph
- Location in Mindanao Location in the Philippines

The Jamiatu Muslim Mindanao (JMM) (lit. 'University of Muslim Mindanao') is one of the oldest and biggest Madaris in the Philippines. It was established with the financial backing from the Agama Islam Society in 1956 by the late Sheikh Ahmad Bashir and his companions from the Ulama (Ustad) and Traditional (Cali) Group. Its English Department was founded in 1987 through Board Resolution No. 1-87, series of 1987 and sought the government recognition in accordance with the provisions of the Ministry of Education, Culture and Sports (MECS) Order No. 24, series of 1985, also known as “Guidelines and Standards for the Recognition and Operation of Madaris.” In the same year, Ma’had Mindanao Al-Arabie Al-Islamia was changed and adopted its present name.

JMM is one of the few Arabic schools (madaris or madrasa) in the country offering the complete levels of Islamic education — kindergarten, complete elementary, complete secondary and college courses. Over the years, the JMM has continued to exist as a non-profit, non-stock educational institution of higher learning with 132 branches throughout the Philippines, predominantly in Mindanao. JMM is an active member of the League of Islamic Universities based in Cairo, Egypt. It was voted as a member of the Executive Council in its General Assembly Meeting held in Amman, Jordan in 1999.

Former ARMM vice-governor Mahid Mutilan graduated on JMM

JMM offers a Certificate of Proficiency in English Language (COPEL).

== History ==
=== Origins ===
The Jamiatu Muslim Mindanao in Marawi City was established and headed by Late Sheikh Ahmad Bashir, who served as president from 1956 until 1989.

=== Founding members of the board of directors ===
- Sheikh Ahmad Basher (founding president and chairman)
- Sheikh Ali S. Usudan (member)
- Sheikh Mohammad Satar (member)
- Sheikh Ibrahim Sharief (member)
- Sheikh Ibrahim Nadeer (member)
- Sheikh Omar Macarimbang (member)
- Hadji Mustafa Pacaambung (member)
- Hadji Abdulmadid Imam (member)
- Hadji Ali Minodar (member)
- Hadji Usman Paporo (member)
- Hadji Nasruddin Basman (member)
- Hadji Cali Ghulam (member)
- Hadji Rascal Cali (member)
- Hadji Abdulmadid Cali (member)
- Atty. Mama Busran (member)

JMM was started with simple primary education in seven classrooms at the residence of former Lanao del Sur Provincial Governor Abdulgaffor Madki Alonto in Lolong, Dansalan (Marawi old name). Dansalan was the capital of the undivided Lanao province. This madrasa was initially named Madrasatul Arabiya, offering preparatory and elementary grades with eight teachers. The first batch had 150 students enrolled. From then on the board of directors started organizing many more madaris in the Mindanao region. In 1961, an agreement was signed between Sheikh Ahmad and Sheikh Abdurrahman Pacasum, owner of land situated at Pacasum Street, Lumbaca Madaya, Marawi City that part of Sheikh Pacasum's land will be used for the madrasa for 30 years without monetary compensation. Meanwhile, a secondary school was established: Ma’had Mindanao Al-Arabie Al-Islamie.

In 1962, the Agama Islam Academy located in Ganassi, Lanao del Sur was established, offering complete levels of English education until it closed in 1987.

In 1972, the Ma’had Mindanao Al-Arabie Al-Islamie was transferred to Darussalam, Matampay, Marawi City as its main campus. Sheikh Esmail Laut Sarip and Lanao del Sur Governor Mohammad Ali Dimaporo assisted sympathetically for the appeal of Sheik Ahmad to his Excellency Philippines President Ferdinand E. Marcos, that a portion of land at the site shall be excluded from military reservation pursuant to Proclamation No. 2223, which was signed by the president.

Moreover, a component part of this land was donated to Agama Islam Society by Sultan Tiboron Maruhom, of Guimba, through the benevolent help of then Marawi city mayor, Omar M. Dianalan, and Hadji Mohammad Camote Maruhom. For many years, it has remained as a madrasa catering to the religious and education needs of the Muslim Filipinos and the Bangsamoro people in the Philippines, particularly in Marawi and the province of Lanao del Sur. In 1987, Ma’had Mindanao Al-Arabie Al-Islamia was changed through board resolution and uses Jamiatu Muslim Mindanao.

In summer of 1987, through Board Resolution No. 1-87, series 1987 and the untiring efforts of Dr. Mohammad Hassoubah, a visiting professor from Republic of Egypt to the Mindanao State University, Hon. Salipada S. Tamano, formerDepartment of Education ARMM Regional Secretary, Dr. Mario Rodriguez, Prof. Marlene H. Tamano, and Prof. Salic L. Mangco the English Department was organized with Jamiatu Muslim Mindanao as its official name. Its education programs are aimed at implementing the kind of education recommended by the First World Conference on Muslim Education (held in Jeddah, Kingdom of Saudi Arabia in 1977) which is concerned with the teaching of spiritual and material aspects needed by Muslim Filipinos living in a modern Philippine society. Courses offered follow government-approved curriculum and are enriched with Islamic and Arabic overtones.

The Jamiatu Muslim Mindanao is now the premier institution of madrasa education not only in Mindanao but also throughout the Philippines.

== Campus ==
The JMM campus is located along the Amai Pakpak national highway at Darussalam, Matampay, Marawi City with an area of 29,995 square metres (322,860 sq ft) within its quadrangle fence. It has two concrete buildings, mosque, lady's dormitory, social hall, stage, playground for soccer football, basketball, and volleyball are found inside the campus.

=== Golden jubilee celebration ===
On June 11, 2006, the Jamiatu Muslim Mindanao began its week-long golden jubilee celebration. The opening ceremony had reading of the Qur'an and flag raising. Open room exhibits featured displays of projects in disciplines such as science, mathematics, history, and Islamic studies. There were contests, not limited to spelling bee and math quizzes, reading Qur'an competition, sports, etc.

On the occasion of the JMM's 50th anniversary, Ismael Saleh, the secretary-general of Jamiatu Muslim Mindanao said that the university is the first institution in the Philippines to introduce and teach Arabic to many generations of Filipino Muslims. Its Arabic language course is attracting Filipino Muslims and non-Muslims alike.

The celebration was concluded by reminding all its components that the JMM is guided by the idea that Islamic education — which emphasizes, spiritual, moral, physical, intellectual social and technical development — is a panacea for ignorance, poverty, illiteracy, and other social ills.

== See also ==
- List of Islamic educational institutions
