= Danilo Palomer Santiago =

Filipino painter

Danilo "Danny" Palomer Santiago
- Born: Danilo Palomer Santiago; November 27, 1951 (age 74); Sorsogon, Philippines
- Known for: Painting, Drawing
- Movement: Eclecticism, Modern Fauvism
- Awards: UST Albertus Magnus Awardee in Visual Arts 2009, UST Benavides Awardee 1971,

Danilo Palomer Santiago (born November 27, 1951) is a Filipino eclectic painter, professor and department chair of University of Santo Tomas - College of Fine Arts and Design (UST-CFAD), Painting Department. His murals are displayed at the Malacaňang Palace, UST Main Building - Faculty of Civil Law and Veterans Memoraila Medical Center and whose works won awards in various art competitions. He was born in Sorsogon and now lives in Manila.

== Early life ==
Santiago was born in Irosin, Sorsogon on November 27, 1951. He started his painting career when he entered college in 1971 at age 17 and finished his college education at the University of Santo Tomas College of Architecture and Fine Arts in Manila, with a degree in painting in 1978. He is also a scholar in the College of Architecture and Fine Arts of UST during his schooldays. He finished his masteral degree in Fine Arts at the UST Graduate School. He now teaches drawing and painting at the UST Department of Painting, where he is also the department chair.

== Awards ==
- Dangal ng UST: GAWAD SAN ALBERTO MAGNO - Visual Arts (Fine Arts & Design) 2009
- UST Benavides Award - College of Architecture and Fine Arts 1979
- Art Association of the Philippines 1979 Art Competition - Gold medalist
- Kulay sa Tubig: Watercolor Painting Competition - Top 5 Watercolorists
- Best Entry - UST On-the-spot painting Competition 1973
- Best Entry - UST On-the-spot Painting Competition 1975
- Award of Recognition in Art Education and Painting -80th Painting Anniversary - UST Atelier Association (2015)
- Grand Prize - Sto. Nino On-the-spot Painting Competition, Malolos, Bulacan- 1979

== Style and influence ==
Danilo Santiago is an eclectic artist. His portfolio includes a diverse array of art movements and media such as watercolor, oil, and pastels. He was trained under Angelito Antonio, Antonio Austria, Bonifacio Cristobal, Wenceslao Garcia, Diosdado Lorenzo, and Mario Parial.

== Exhibitions ==
=== One-man shows ===
- Kulay Isa - Gallery 1, San Juan, 1977
- Alay-kapwa - Makati Showroom, Makati, Philippines
- Ecology - Gen Luna Gallery, Davao City, Philippines
- Mithiin Makapilipino - Gallery Genesis, Mandaluyong, Philippines
- Inigma - Heritage Gallery, Cubao, Quezon City, Philippines

=== Group exhibitions ===
- Benavidez Art Group : First group show - February 1, 2014, Art Asia Gallery, Megamall
- AAP Selected Artists Exhibit 2013 - November 11, 2013, Adamson University Art Gallery, San Marcelino St. Ermita, Manila.
- 1st Beato Angelico Visual Arts and Design Conference and Exhibit - February 16, 2013, National Museum of the Philippines
- Philippine - Korea International Exhibition 2012
- BazaART ‘09 - at One Workshop Gallery, August 29 and 30, features paintings, photographs, sculptures, etchings and prints by Filipino greats and foreign artists
- Kristo Exhibit: 'Into Thy Hands' - the exhibit was featured in two separate displays at the 1/Of Gallery in Serendra, Bonifacio Global City, Taguig and at the Choice Expression Gallery in Makati.

BIKOL EXPRESSIONS - Art Center, Megamall, Mandaluyong, Philippines -2015 "Meeting of the Minds"- ArtAsia Gallery, megamall, Mandaluyong, Philippines "Brushstrokes"- Students and faculty joint exhibit for the Freshmen Parents' Orientation of Painting Program of CFAD-UST

== Affiliated art groups ==
=== Art Association of the Philippines ===
The Art Association of the Philippines is an art organization that aims to "advance and foster, and promote the interests of those who work in the visual arts."

- 2014 - 2016 OFFICER Vice President - External Affairs
- 2012 - 2014 OFFICER Auditor

=== Benavidez Art Group ===
The Benavidez Art Group consists of eight alumni artists from the University of Santo Tomas (UST). The group's work and collaborative efforts are centered on their shared background as Thomasian graduates.

=== Tuesday Group of Artists ===
Tuesday Art Group is a small group of Filipino artists decided to tear down the disarray among local visual artists, and organized an umbrella group called Visual Artists Cooperative of the Philippines (VACOOP). Otherwise known as the Tuesday Group of Artists.

=== Gruppo Biswal ===
Gruppo Biswal an art group composed of visual artists who work using various media.

=== Grupong Tomasino ===
Grupong Tomasino is group of 69 alumni and faculty members of UST-CFAD.

BIKOL Expressions Art Group

== Other facts ==
- He is also participated in the OTSAA (On The Spot Artists’ Association, Incorporation) attempt to break the Guinness World Records for the longest painting on a continuous canvas along with 300 participants.
