= Rey Paz Contreras =

Filipino sculptor

Sculpture of mother and child by Contreras made from discarded century-old molave hardwood, texturized stainless steel and other materials indigenous to the Philippines

Rey Paz Contreras (August 31, 1950-March 23, 2021) is a prominent Filipino sculptor working with urban refuse and environmental materials as artistic media. He is inspired by the indigenous Filipino culture and creates visual forms of contemporary images that explore a distinct Filipino aesthetics.

== Life and work ==
Rey Paz Contreras was born in Parañaque, south of Manila, and grew up in a house by the railway tracks in the crowded urban district of Tayuman. When the railway company decided to replace the old wooden railroad sleepers, some of them 100 years old and severely damaged, Contreras bought the wood and began using it to create wooden objects. At first these were functional objects such as bowls, often reflecting irregularities in the wood. Contreras' sculpture often still has a functional aspect.

Through the years, Contreras has experimented on non-traditional art materials in his quest for contemporary Filipino art. Aside from the travieza, he explored using logging refuse (roots and branches) in order to pave way for reforestation efforts and to help organize backyard industry to onion farmers who supplied and eventually were trained to use the hardwood refuse salvaged from the river as art material. After the devastating Mount Pinatubo eruption, Contreras experimented on using the volcanic rocks and lahar to sculpt human figures reminiscent of the indigenous Aeta and lowland communities who were displaced by the volcanic eruption; these stone sculptures were exhibited at the Cultural Center of the Philippines, paving way for further exploration of the volcanic materials as art media.

As an artist, Contreras is also a pioneering spirit in the development of community-based people's art. He has conducted workshops in the provinces and has organized self-sustaining community craft-based art groups such as Cadaclan Carvers in Pantabangan, Nueva Ecija, Malasiqui carvers in Pangasinan and more recently the Banglos Art Group in Quezon Province; he has taught woodcarving on other provinces such as Capiz, Rizal and Abra. He has also been supportive of progressive religious organizations, most notable is his partnership with the Missionaries of Jesus (MJ). Some of the more popular public art of Contreras can be found on chapels like Calaruega and Chapel on the Hill in Batulao, Batangas (near Tagaytay); his work in Sagada, Mountain Province is found inside the Episcopalian Church.

Contreras currently has his studio near the railroad tracks in Tondo, Manila, where he conducts his community-based art training to promote a socially-responsive 'people's art' that has developed into the Daambakal Sculptors Collective. Contreras' pioneered the use of travieza or hardwood railroad tracks during the late 70s.

== Activism ==
An activist during the repressive Marcos regime, Contreras employs his art as a form of agency. Using local and available materials, he critiques the local artists' dependence on foreign art, not only in media but also in concept and form. This rejection of the western cultural hegemony as form of anti-colonial, anti-fascist sentiment was part of the broader Social Realism art movement in the Philippines and is a central part of the continuing recognition of the importance of the Social Realist movement.

== Recognition ==
Contreras' significant contribution to the development of contemporary Filipino/Philippine art has been recognized by various art organizations and cultural institutions since the early 1990s. He was conferred the prestigious Patnubay ng Lahi Award by the City of Manila in 1992. That same year, he was awarded the Grand Prize at the Art Association of the Philippines Annual Art Competition - Sculpture Category. In 1994, he was the recipient of the 1st Bonifacio Art Foundation Inc. Public Art Competition, his sculptural monument entitled The Trees is the first permanent structure unveiled at the Bonifacio Global City in Taguig, Metro Manila. Institutions that have the work of Contreras in its permanent collection includes the National Museum, Cultural Center of the Philippines, GSIS Museo ng Sining (GSIS Museum of Art), GMA Network and BAFI. He has conducted sculptural training workshop in the regions and has been invited to exhibit in Japan, Singapore, Malaysia, Canada, Cuba, Brazil, Australia and the United States.
