= Ceremonial mace =

Ornamental staff to show authority rather than as an actual weapon

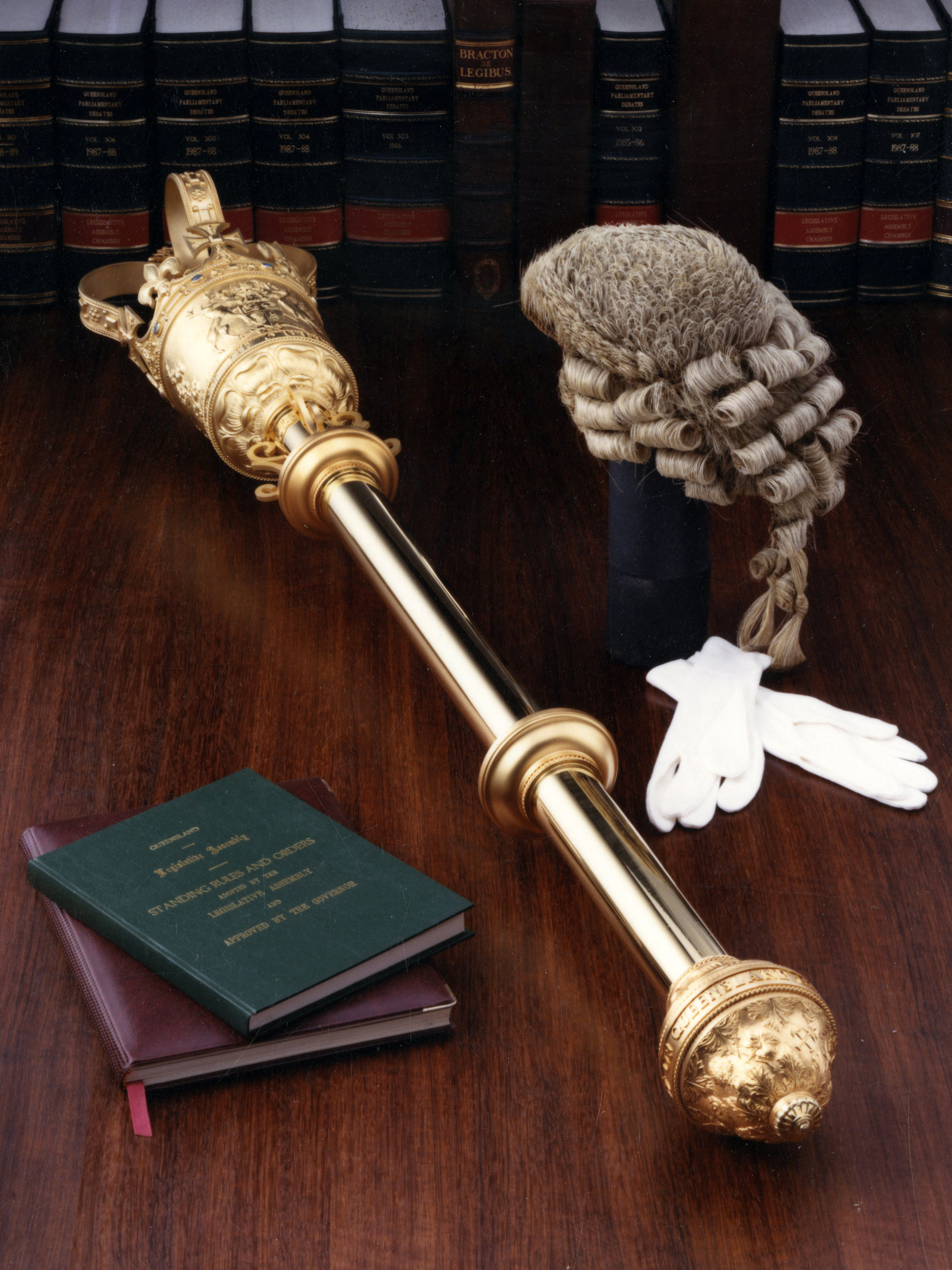
Ceremonial mace of the Queensland Parliament, Australia

A ceremonial mace is a highly ornamented staff of metal or wood, carried before a sovereign or other high officials in civic ceremonies by a mace-bearer, intended to represent the official's authority. The mace, as used today, derives from the original mace used as a weapon. Processions often feature maces, as on parliamentary or formal academic occasions.

== History ==
=== Ancient Near East ===
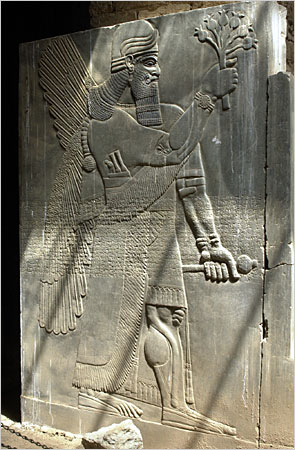
Ceremonial mace (left hand) depicted on a stela from Nimrud

Ceremonial maces originated in the Ancient Near East, where they were used as symbols of rank and authority across the region during the late Stone Age, Bronze Age, and early Iron Age. Among the oldest known ceremonial maceheads are the Ancient Egyptian Scorpion Macehead and Narmer Macehead; both are elaborately engraved with royal scenes, although their precise role and symbolism are obscure. In later Mesopotamian art, the mace is more clearly associated with authority; by the Old Babylonian period the most common figure on cylinder seals (a type of seal used to authenticate clay documents) is a repeated type now known as "The Figure with Mace" who wears a royal hat, holds a mace in his left hand, and is thought to represent a generic king. Ceremonial maces are also prominently depicted in the royal art of Ancient Assyria, such as the Stela of Ashurnasirpal II and the Stela of Shamshi-Adad V, in which the Assyrian kings are shown performing rites or making religious gestures while holding a mace to symbolise their authority.

=== Eastern Roman Empire ===
Some officials of the medieval Eastern Roman Empire carried maces for either practical or ceremonial purposes. Notable among the latter is the protoallagator, a military-judicial position that existed by about the 10th century A.D. and whose symbols of office were reported by the Palaiologan writer Pseudo-Kodinos in the 14th century to include a silver-gilt mace (matzouka). At this time the duties of the protoallagator included commanding the Byzantine Emperor's personal allagion, his military retinue. The ceremonial function of the mace may have passed to the late Roman Empire from the ancient Near East by way of Persia, and from there to other European cultures.

=== Medieval and Renaissance Europe ===
The earliest ceremonial maces in France and England were practical weapons intended to protect the King's person, borne by the Sergeants-at-Arms, a royal bodyguard established in France by Philip II, and in England probably by Richard I (c. 1180). By the 14th century, these sergeants' maces had started to become increasingly decorative, encased in precious metals. As a weapon, the mace fell out of use with the disappearance of heavy armour.

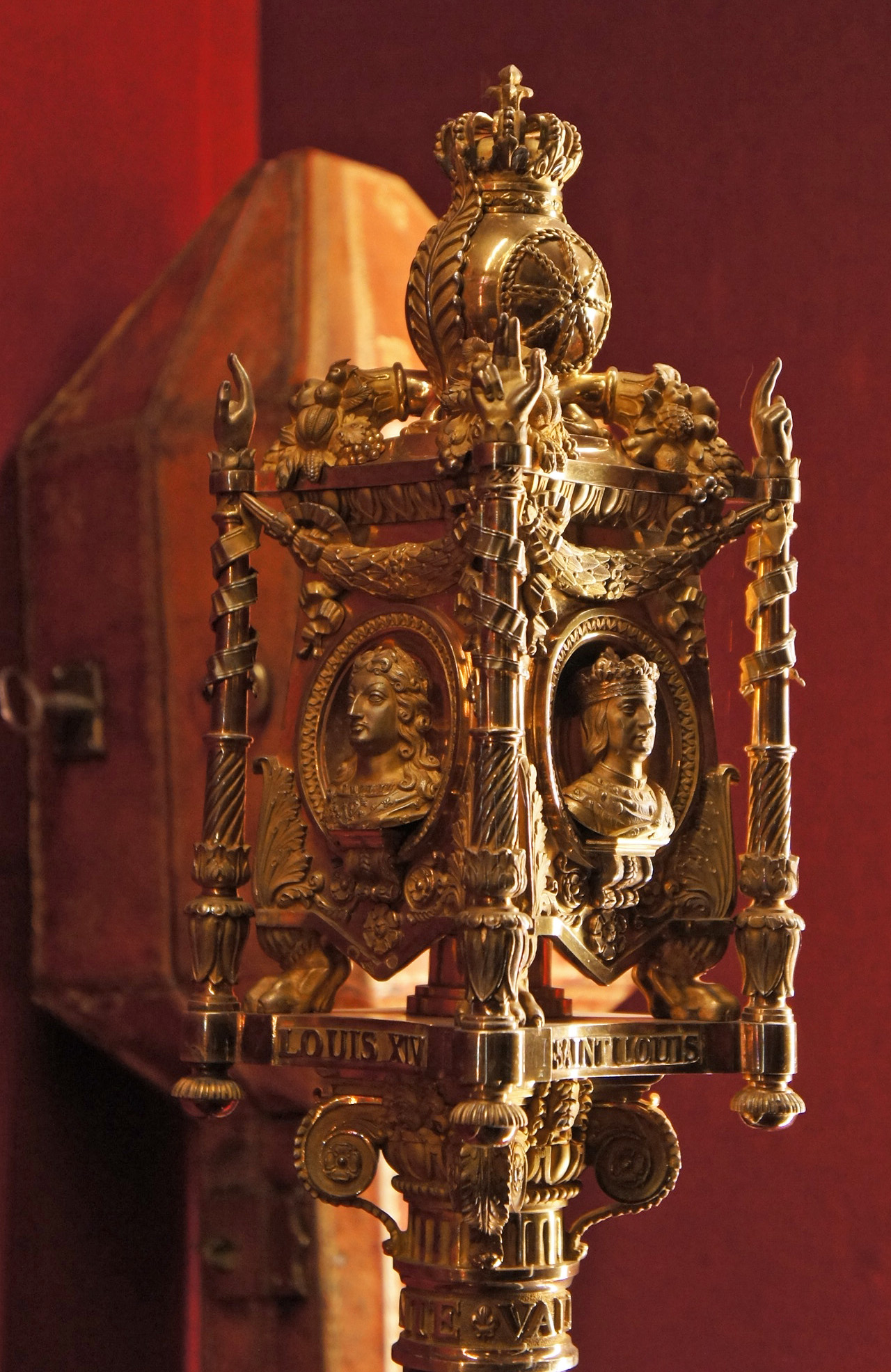
French ceremonial mace, 18th century

The history of the civic mace (carried by the sergeants-at-arms) begins around the middle of the 13th century, though no examples from that period remain today. The oldest civic mace in England (still remaining today) is that of Hedon. It was granted (along with an important charter) in 1415. At the time, ornamented civic maces were considered an infringement of one of the privileges of the king's sergeants, who alone deserved to bear maces enriched with costly metals, according to a House of Commons petition of 1344. However, the sergeants of London later gained this privilege, as did later those of York (1396), Norwich (1403–1404), and Chester (1506). Records exist of maces covered with silver in use at Exeter in 1387–1388; Norwich bought two in 1435, and Launceston others in 1467 and 1468. Several other cities and towns subsequently acquired silver maces, and the 16th century saw almost universal use.

Early in the 15th century, the flanged end of the mace (the head of the war mace) was carried uppermost, with the small button bearing the royal arms in the base. By the beginning of the Tudor period, however, the blade-like flanges, originally made for offence, degenerated into mere ornaments, while the increased importance of the end with the royal arms (afterwards enriched with a cresting) resulted in the reversal of the position. The custom of carrying the flanged end upward did not die out at once: a few maces, such as the Winchcombe silver maces, which date from the end of the 15th century, were made to be carried both ways. The Guildford mace provides one of the finest of the fifteen specimens of the 15th century.

Craftsmen often pierced and decorated the flanged ends of the maces of this period beautifully. These flanges gradually became smaller, and by the 16th or early 17th century had developed into pretty projecting scroll-brackets and other ornaments, which remained in vogue until about 1640. The next development in the embellishment of the shaft was the reappearance of these small scroll-brackets on the top, immediately under the head of the mace. They disappear altogether from the foot in the last half of the 17th century, and remain only under the heads, or, in rarer instances, on a knob on the shaft. The silver mace-heads were mostly plain, with a cresting of leaves or flowers in the 15th and 16th centuries. In the reign of James I of England they began to be engraved and decorated with heraldic devices and similar ornamentation.

As the custom of having sergeants' maces began to die out about 1650, the large maces borne before the mayor or bailiffs came into general use. Thomas Maundy functioned as the chief maker of maces during the Commonwealth of England. He made the mace for the House of Commons in 1649. This mace is still in use today, though without the original head. The original head, which was not engraved with regal symbols, was replaced by one with regal symbols at the time of the Restoration of the monarchy. Oliver Cromwell referred to the House of Commons mace as "a fool's bauble" when he dissolved the Rump Parliament in 1653.

== Commonwealth ==
Most Commonwealth countries were formerly part of the British Empire and continue the tradition of using a mace, especially to represent the authority of the Sovereign in the parliaments of the Commonwealth realms.

=== United Kingdom ===
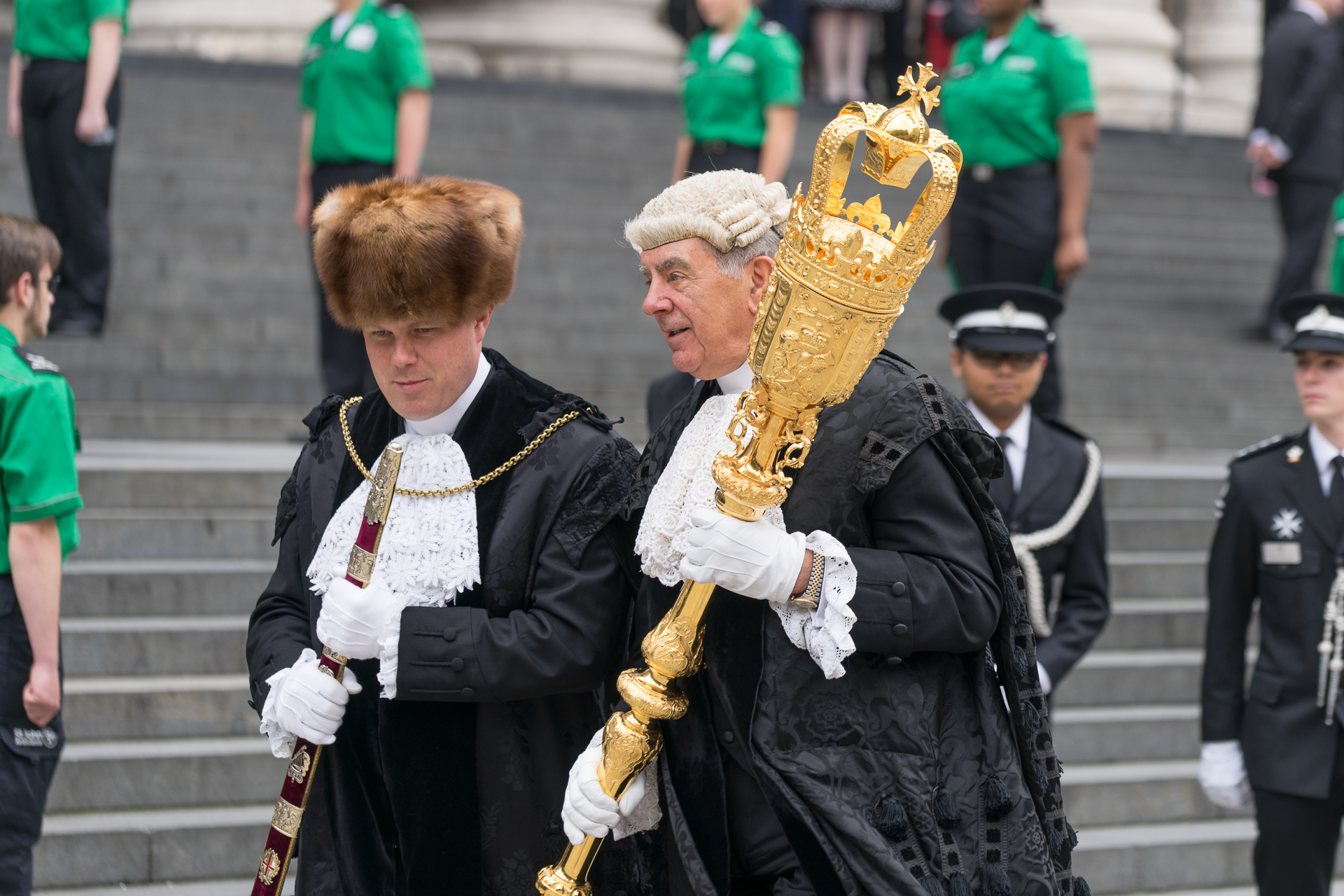
Mace of the City of London

In the United Kingdom there are thirteen surviving royal maces in the Crown Jewels, ten of which are kept in the Jewel House at the Tower of London, while three are on permanent loan to the Houses of Parliament. Each mace is about 1.5 m (4.9 ft) long and weighs an average of 10 kg (22 lb). The House of Commons can only operate lawfully when the royal mace – dating from the reign of Charles II – is present at the table. Two other maces dating from the reigns of Charles II and William III are used by the House of Lords: One is placed on the Woolsack before the House meets and is absent when a monarch is there in person. Two maces from the Jewel House are carried in the royal procession at State Openings of Parliament and British coronations. The Scottish Parliament and the Senedd (Welsh Parliament) have their own maces, as do local councils, mayors, and some universities.

=== Australia ===
The ceremonial maces of the Australian House of Representatives and the Australian Senate symbolise both the authority of each chamber and the royal authority of Australia's monarch.

==== Senate ====
The ceremonial mace of the Australian Senate is the Black Rod. The ceremonial custodian of the Black Rod is the Usher of the Black Rod.

==== House of Representatives ====
The Serjeant-at-Arms of the Australian House of Representatives is the ceremonial custodian of the Mace of the House. At the beginning and end of every day the House sits, the Speaker of the House enters and leaves the House preceded by the Serjeant-at-Arms carrying the mace on his or her right shoulder. The mace represents the authority of the monarch, the speaker and the house itself and is usually taken with the speaker on ceremonial occasions. However, in the presence of the governor-general the mace is generally left outside and covered with a green cloth on the understanding that a symbol of royal authority is not needed where the Crown’s actual representative is present.

The current mace is made of gilded silver, and was a gift to the House from King George VI on the occasion of the 50th anniversary of Federation in 1951. It was presented to the House by a delegation of members of the British House of Commons.

In May 1914, Labor MP William Higgs played a practical joke on the House by hiding the mace under one of the opposition frontbenches. It was not found for two hours, and police were called in as it was assumed to have been stolen. After initially denying his role in the incident, Higgs apologised to his colleagues the following week, stating he had acted in "a spirit of frivolity". His admission that he was "entirely to blame" was met with cheers.

==== Queensland Parliament ====
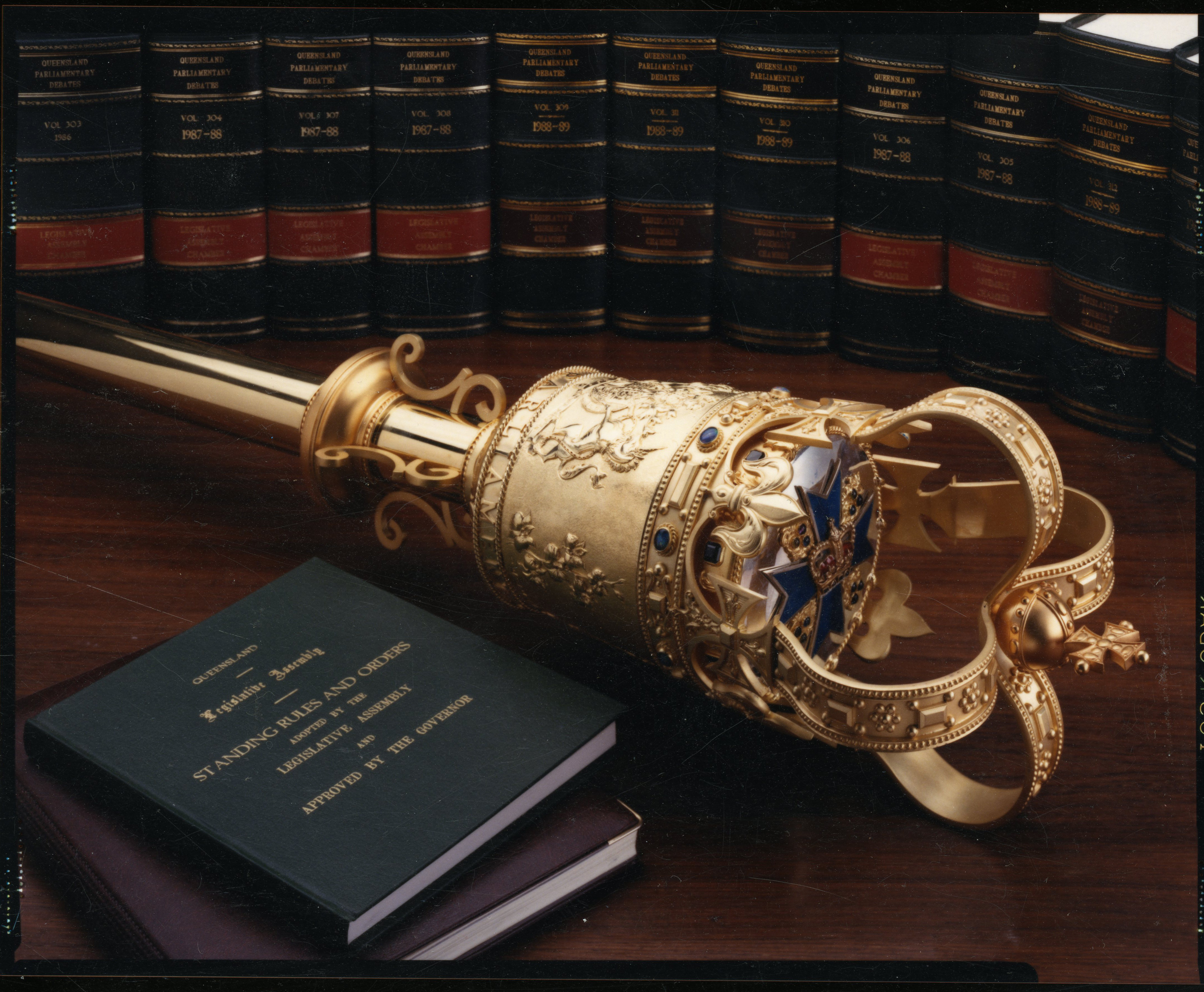
Ceremonial mace, Queensland Parliament, 1979

A silver-gilt mace was produced for the Queensland Parliament in 1978 by Marples and Beasley of Birmingham, United Kingdom. It is 1.22 metres (4.0 ft) long and weighs 7.7 kilograms (17 lb). The mace is inlaid with 15 sapphires, 9 opals, 6 amethysts and 2 garnets, all originating from the state of Queensland.

=== Bahamas ===
The ceremonial maces in the Bahamas symbolise both the authority of each chamber and the Royal authority of Charles III, the King of the Bahamas.

On 27 April 1965, a day known in the Bahamas as "Black Tuesday", Lynden Pindling, then Opposition Leader, threw the 165-year-old Speaker's Mace out of a House of Assembly window to protest against the unfair gerrymandering of constituency boundaries by the then ruling United Bahamian Party (UBP) government. The Speaker tried to restore order but he was reminded by Labour leader Randol Fawkes that the business of the House could not legally continue without the mace. The badly damaged mace was recovered by the police and returned to the House.

The House of Assembly reconvened with a temporary wooden mace loaned by Canada; this was the same temporary mace used by the House of Commons of Canada after it lost its own mace to a fire in 1916. The temporary mace ultimately returned to Canada freshly gilded. In November 1975, the House of Commons of the United Kingdom donated a new mace to the House of Assembly.

On 3 December 2001, Cassius Stuart and Omar Smith, leader and deputy leader of the Bahamas Democratic Movement, a minor political party, charged from the public gallery onto the floor of the House of Assembly and handcuffed themselves to the Mace in protest against "unfair gerrymandering" of constituency boundaries by the Free National Movement (FNM) government. The Mace was unable to be separated from the men and the sitting of the House had to be suspended. The pair were jailed for almost two days but no charges were brought against them.

In 2024 senior police officers had been charged with drug trafficking offenses and during a debate about government corruption the Speaker Patricia Deveaux did not let the deputy opposition leader, Shanendon Cartwright speak. Cartwright grabbed the mace and threw it out of a nearby window. He was subsequently suspended.

=== Canada ===
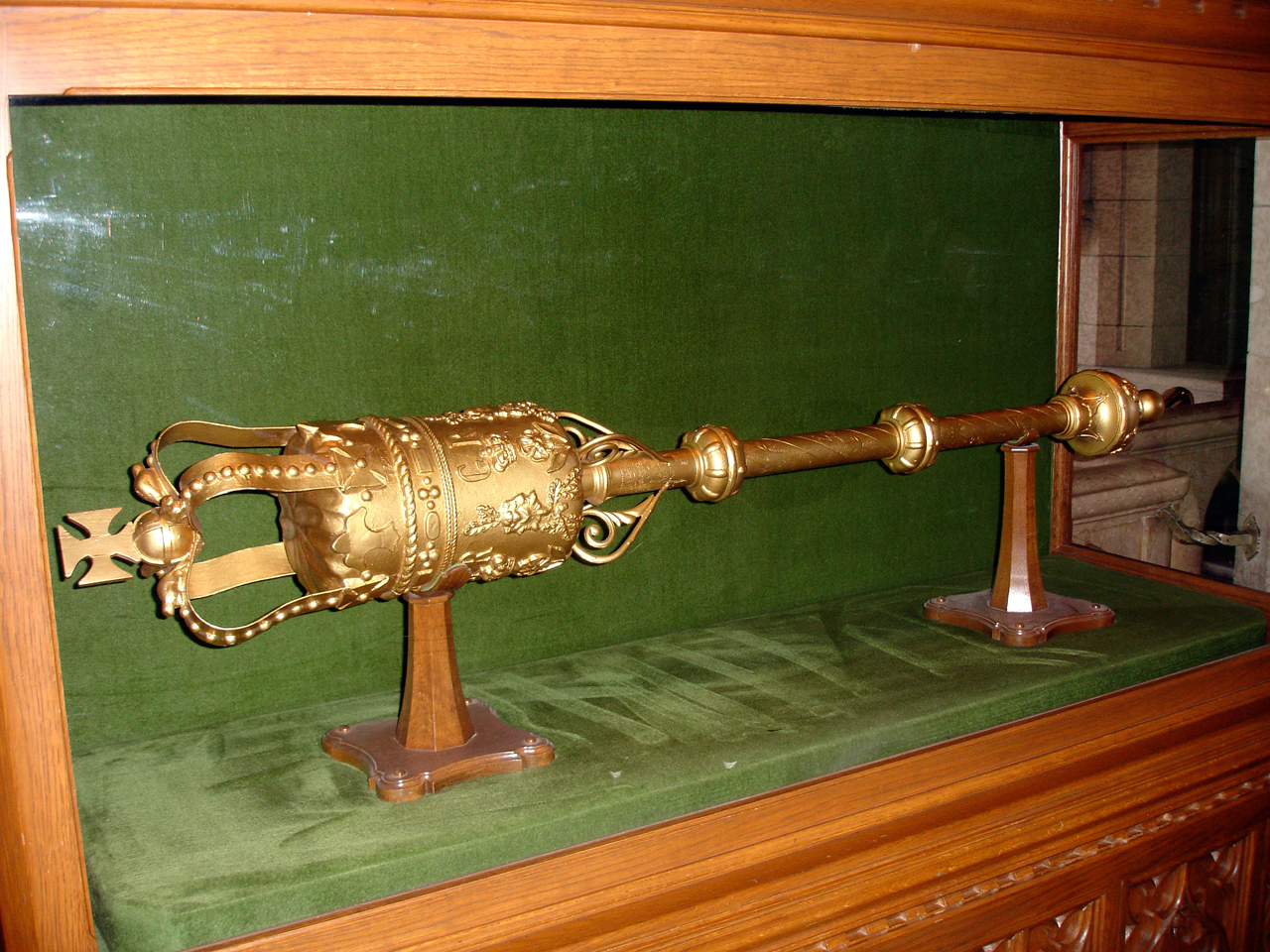
Mace of the Senate of Canada, on display at the Parliament of Canada's senate foyer

The ceremonial maces in the Canadian Senate and House of Commons embody the authority each chamber derives from the country's sovereign. It also represents the Royal authority of Charles III, the King of Canada. The current mace in the Commons is the fourth mace, a replica of the third one destroyed by fire at the Centre Block in 1916.

A similar practice is employed in each of the provincial and territorial legislatures, with a mace representing the sovereign's authority and power in each of the respective legislatures.

=== Cook Islands ===
In 2023, the parliament of the Cook Islands adopted a ceremonial double-ended mace (Cook Islands Māori: Te Taiki Mana) in the form of a canoe paddle (ʻoe), inspired by the combination of traditional forms used in both the northern and southern Cook Islands, on one side and a spear (momore ʻakatara) on the other, with the emblem of the Cook Islands parliament in the middle. The mace was designed by Tangata Vainerere, the clerk of the Cook Islands parliament, and carved by master carver Michael Tavioni, with support from David Maruariki and additions by Wireless Tomokino. It is 1.45 metres long, carved from polynesian mahogany, and covered with traditional tattoo motifs.

During sittings of the parliament it is placed by the Sergeant-at-Arms in the parliamentary chamber with the paddle end pointing toward the government benches, and the spear end pointed toward the opposition.

=== Fiji ===
On 10 October 1874, Fiji's former king, Seru Epenisa Cakobau, gave his war club to Queen Victoria when the Deed of Cession by which the sovereignty of Fiji passed to the British Crown was signed, and the war club was taken to Britain and kept at Windsor Castle. In October 1932, King Cakobau's war club was repatriated to Fiji, on behalf of the British king George V, for use as the ceremonial mace of the Legislative Council of Fiji.

The mace is a gadi, a traditional Fijian club named for the type of hardwood tree it is made from, and was decorated with silver palm leaves and doves upon Cakobau's conversion to Christianity. Cakobau gave the club the name Ai Tutuvi Kuta I Radini Bau, meaning "The sedge blanket of the Queen of Bau (wife of the Roko Tui Bau)".

The mace is used as a symbol of the authority of the Speaker of the Parliament of Fiji. It is carried into parliament by the mace bearer, and is always placed on the central table of the debating chamber with the head pointing toward the government benches.

An image of the mace is used on the emblem of the Fijian parliament.

=== Guyana ===
The National Assembly, the sole chamber of the Parliament of Guyana, has a ceremonial mace. In March 1991, Isahak Basir, a member of the People's Progressive Party (in opposition at the time), was expelled from parliament for removing the mace from its place on the table, and also for throwing his drinking glass at the Speaker.

=== India ===
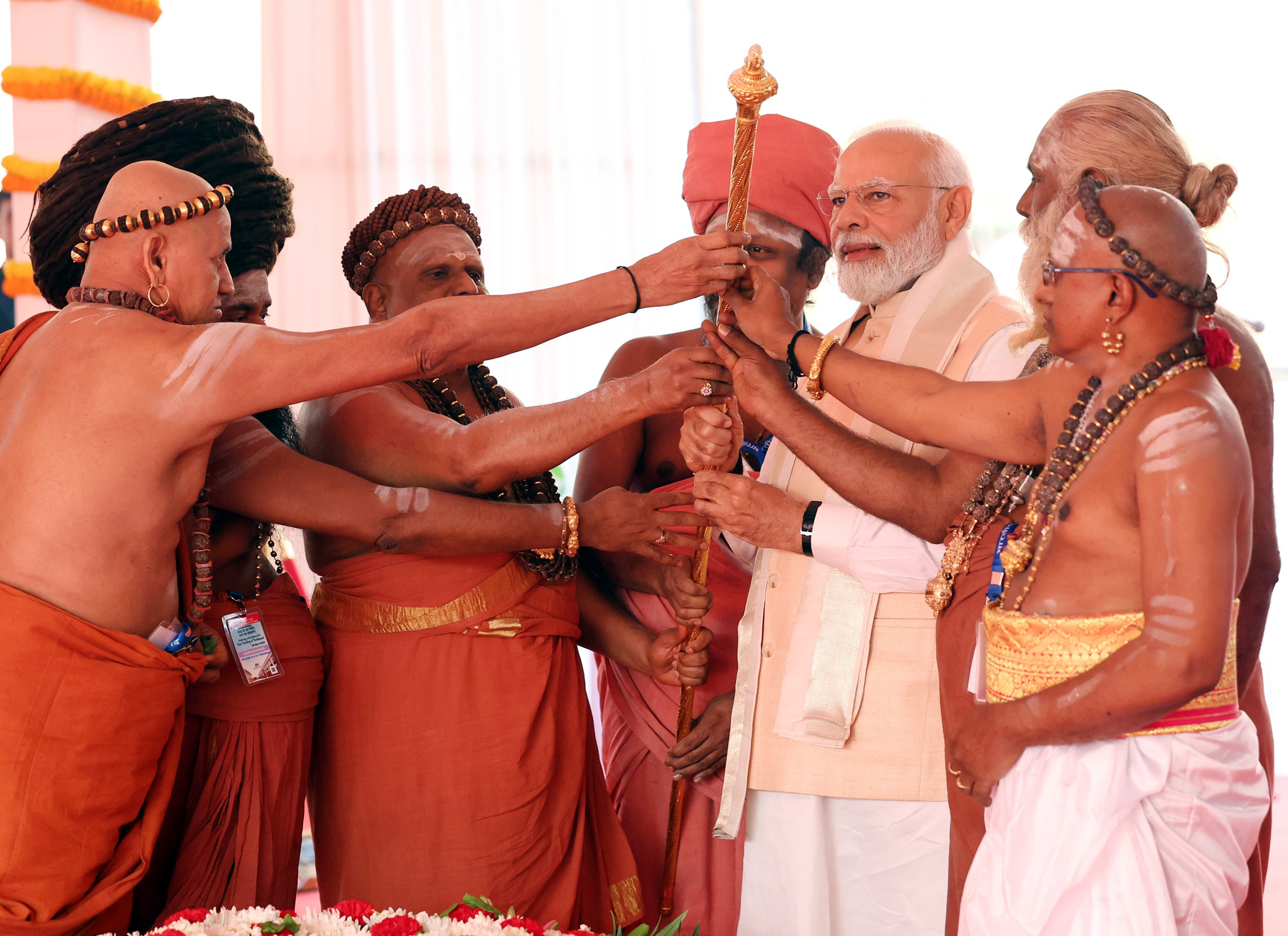
PM Modi receives ‘Sengol’ from Hindu priests in 2023

Sengol is a gold-plated silver sceptre that is installed in India's New Parliament House. Originally gifted to Jawaharlal Nehru, the first prime minister of India, by a delegation of holy men on 14 August 1947, the sceptre was housed in the Allahabad Museum for seven decades. In 2023, the sceptre was moved to the newly-constructed Parliament House by the government of Narendra Modi, who propagated an ahistorical narrative by claiming the Sengol as a symbol of the transfer of power from the British regime unto Indians.

The legislative bodies of several states, such as Tripura, also have ceremonial maces. The courts of various Indian princely states were recorded as having ceremonial maces too.

=== New Zealand ===
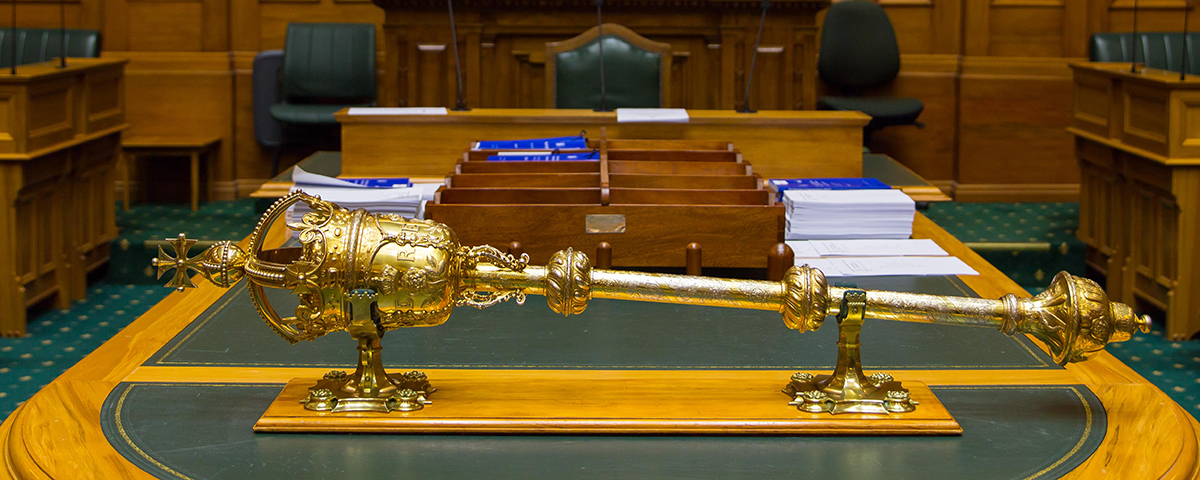
The current ceremonial mace of the New Zealand House of Representatives

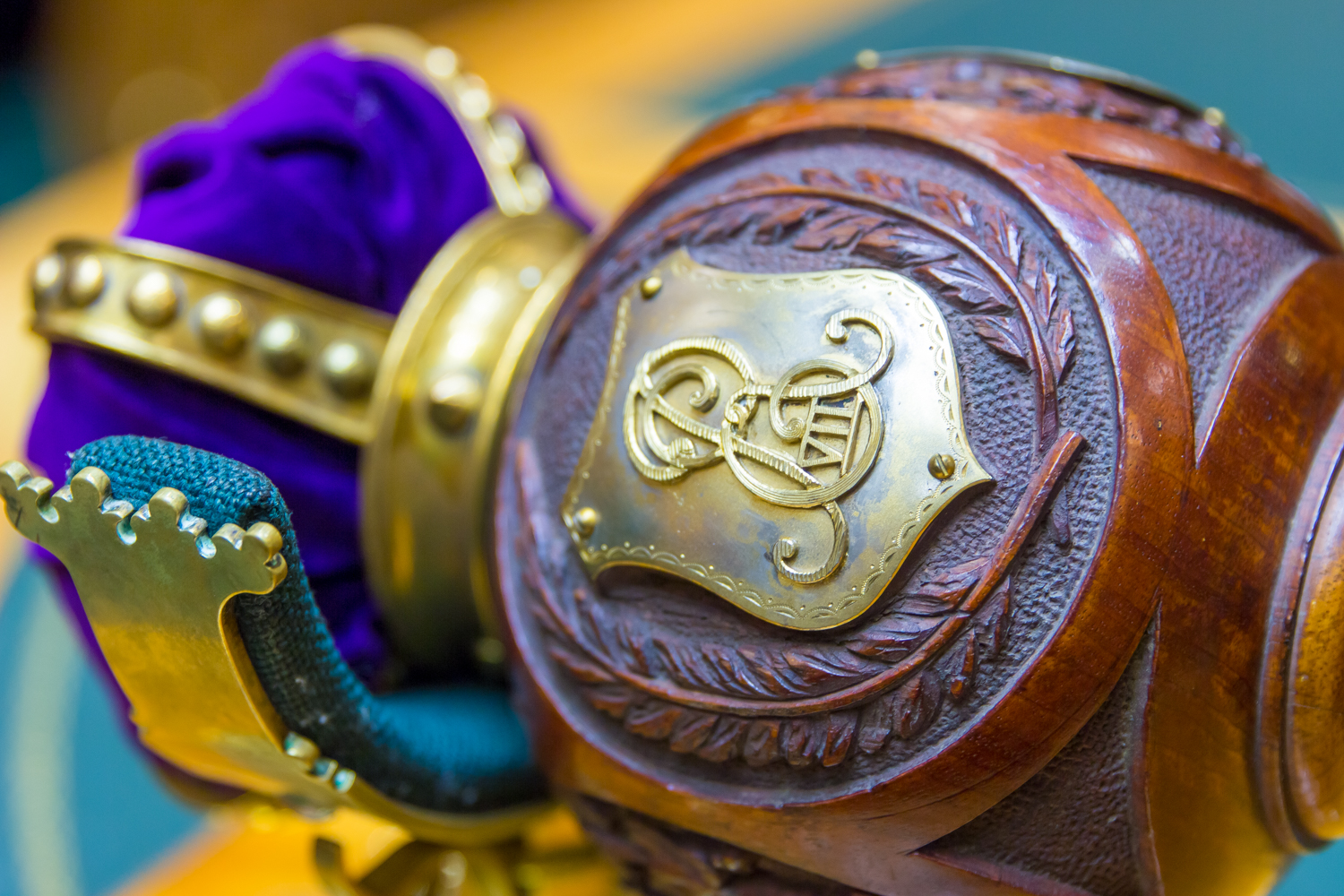
The head of the 1907-1909 temporary wooden ceremonial mace, showing the royal cypher of Edward VII

A ceremonial mace for the New Zealand House of Representatives has been used since 1866, when one was presented to Parliament by former Speaker Sir Charles Clifford. The mace is considered to be a symbol of the authority of both the Speaker and of the House, and is carried by the Serjeant-at-Arms.

The first mace was destroyed on 11 December 1907 when a fire consumed most of Parliament Buildings. A wooden mace made of pūriri and designed by the Government Architect was temporarily used until a new mace was gifted by then Prime Minister Joseph Ward in 1909 at the prompting of Speaker Arthur Guinness. This mace is the one currently in use.

The present mace is modeled on that of the House of Commons of the United Kingdom, differing only in that one of the panels instead depicts the Southern Cross and the initials "NZ". The mace is 1.498 metres long, made of sterling silver coated with 18 carat gilt gold and weighs 8.164 kilograms.

==== Wellington ====
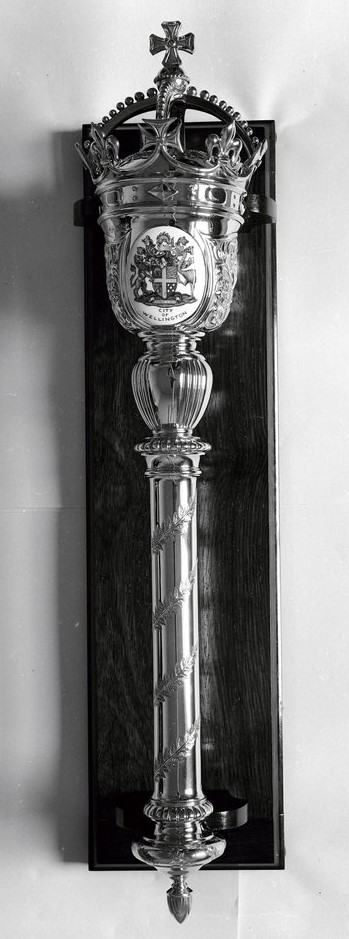
Ceremonial mace of the City of Wellington (black & white photo)

The capital city of Wellington also possesses a silver-gilt ceremonial mace, gifted to it by its sister city of Harrogate in 1954, which is used during meetings of the Wellington City Council and on ceremonial occasions.

=== Singapore ===
The Parliament of Singapore has a mace which had been originally commissioned in 1954 by Governor John Nicoll for the Legislative Council of Singapore.

The mace head is a winged lion holding a trident. Just below the mace head, on the shaft of the mace are the crest of the coat of arms of the Colony of Singapore and the crest of Coat of arms of the United Kingdom, on opposite sides. The rest of the shaft is embossed with lion heads and Chinese junks, and the bottom of the shaft is decorated with waves and fish. The base of the mace depicts a gryphon's head above a crown, the crest of the coat of arms of Stamford Raffles. An image of the mace appears on the crest of Singapore's parliament.

=== South Africa ===
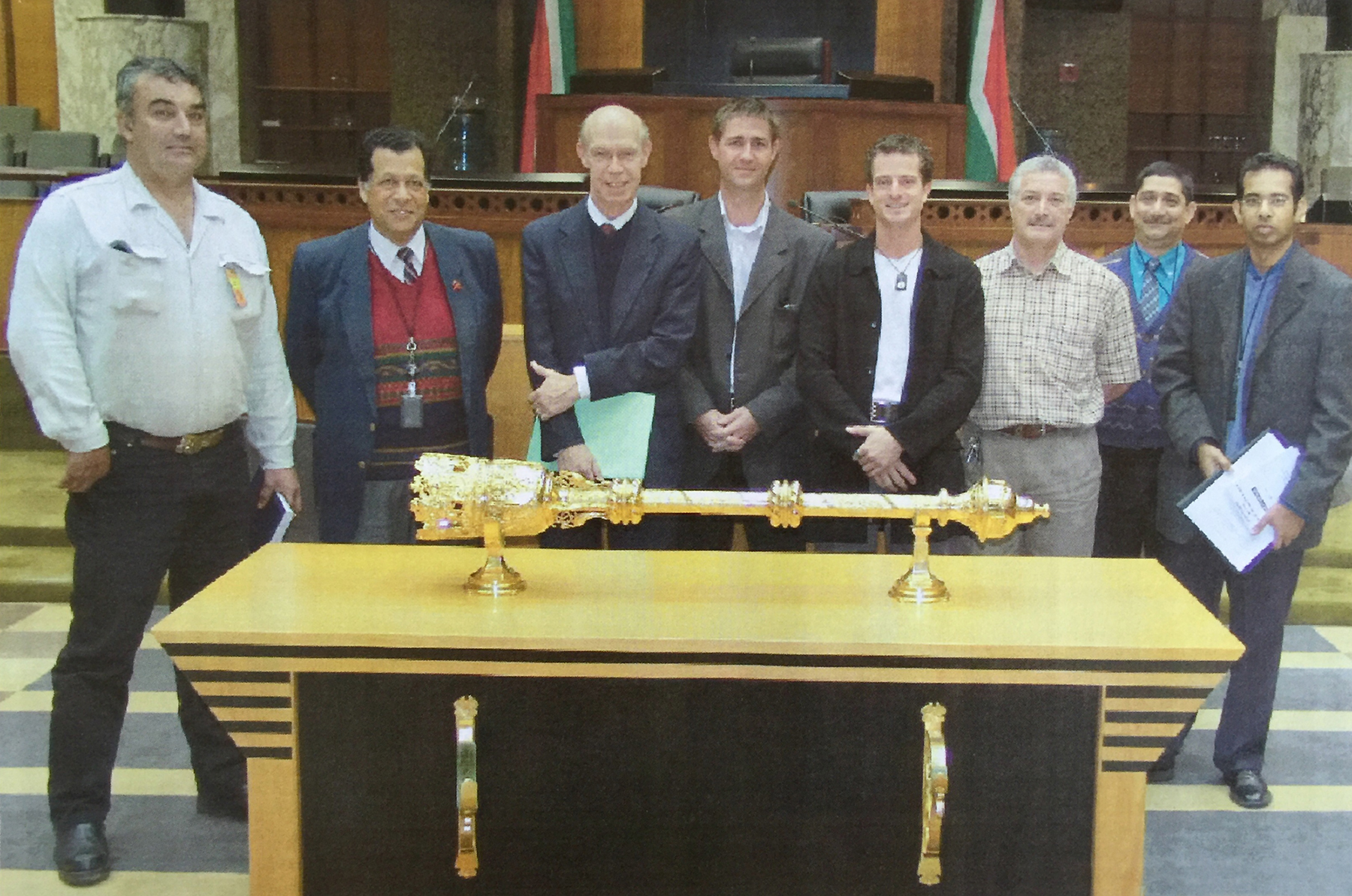
The 1963-2004 South African mace

As a Dominion of the British Empire, the Union of South Africa House of Assembly used a mace modelled on that of the UK House of Commons from 1910 to 1961.

When South Africa became a republic outside the Commonwealth in 1961, a Stinkwood mace was used temporarily until 1963 when the Gold Producers' Committee of the Transvaal and Orange Free State Chamber of Mines gifted a mace to the chamber.

In 2004 a new mace was designed to reflect the history, tradition, diversity, culture and languages of South Africa. Based on an aluminium shaft with a gold drum featuring images of working South Africans, the mace remains in use today as the symbol of the authority of the National Assembly of South Africa.

=== Sri Lanka ===
The ceremonial jeweled mace, symbolizing the authority of the Parliament of Sri Lanka, is kept in the custody of the Serjeant-at-Arms. The mace, when kept on its stand in the Chamber, signifies that the House is in session. At the commencement of a Session, the Serjeant-at-Arms bearing the mace accompanies the Speaker when entering and leaving the Chamber. The mace has to be legally brought into the House at the appointed time and removed at the end of the Session. Therefore, unauthorized removal of the mace cannot invalidate proceedings.

=== Other maces with Connection to the British monarch ===
There are two maces in Jamaica, made in 1753 and 1787; one belonging to the colony of Grenada, made in 1791, and the speaker's mace at Barbados, dating from 1812.

== Hong Kong ==
The Judiciary of Hong Kong maintains the English tradition of opening its legal year with a ceremonial mace carried by the Mace Bearer, who precedes the chief justice in the ceremony. The silver mace has been used since the early 20th century, with the royal arms on the butt end replaced with the emblem of the special administrative region after the 1997 handover. All of the high court's maces (both imperial and post-handover) are held in the Exhibition Gallery of the University of Hong Kong.

== Ireland ==
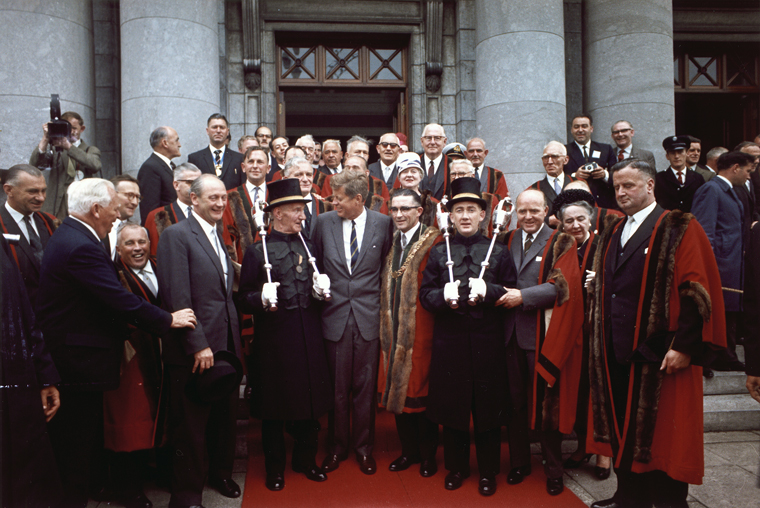
John F. Kennedy visits Seán McCarthy, Lord Mayor of Cork, 1963

=== Mace of former Parliament of Ireland ===
A mace made in 1765 for the Irish House of Commons is 1.5 m (58 in) long and weighs 8.4 kg (295 oz) and became redundant in 1801 with the creation of the United Kingdom of Great Britain and Ireland. In 1937, the Bank of Ireland bought the mace from the descendants of John Foster, its last Speaker, the House having ceased to exist upon the Acts of Union 1800. The bank paid IR£3,100 for the mace at a Christie's auction. In 2015, it represented Ireland at the 800th anniversary of the Lord Mayor's Show in the City of London.

=== The Great Mace of Dublin ===
The Great Mace of Dublin is used at major civic and ceremonial events alongside the Great Sword, such as when the Lord Mayor awards the honorary Freedom of the city. It was made in 1717 and contains parts of an earlier mace made for the city's first Lord Mayor, Sir Daniel Bellingham.

=== Academic maces ===
The ceremonial mace of Trinity College Dublin was still in use in 2021, and University College Cork also has a mace and a mace-bearer.

== Myanmar (Burma) ==
A ceremonial mace was an essential item of the regalia of Myanmar's legislative bodies during the British colonial period. It kept its significance and symbolism in the early post-independence legislatures. Parliamentary democracy ceased in 1962, but when the regime of General Ne Win revived a one-party unicameral legislature in 1974, the mace-bearing ceremonial was abandoned. It was re-introduced in the new parliament, or Pyidaungsu Hluttaw, convened under the 2008 National Constitution.

== Philippines ==
The House of Representatives and the Senate of the Philippines each have a respective mace. The maces are almost identical.

The mace of the House of Representatives serves as a symbol of authority and in the custody of the Sergeant-at-Arms. It serves as a guarantee for the Sergeant-at-Arms in enforcing peace and order in the House upon the Speaker's instruction. Upon every session, the mace is placed at the foot of the Speaker's rostrum. The mace is topped by the official seal of the House of Representatives.

The mace of the Senate serves as a symbol of authority. It is displayed at the Senate President's rostrum every session. As with the House of Representatives, the Sergeant-at-Arms also serves as the custodian of the mace. When there is disorderly conduct in the Senate, the Sergeant-at-Arms brings the mace from its pedestal and presents it to the senators causing the disorder, a signal to stop such behavior. The official seal of the Senate tops the mace.

Provincial boards, city and municipal councils also have their own mace.

The constitutional body Commission on Appointments also uses their own mace during their plenary sessions.

== United States ==
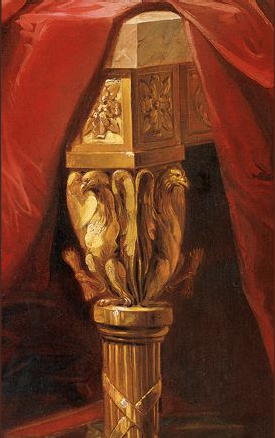
From Gilbert Stuart's 1796 Lansdowne Portrait: The table leg may have been inspired by a wooden ceremonial mace used by the U.S. House of Representatives (the House's symbol was itself inspired by the Roman fasces). The House mace was a bundle of tied reeds topped with a bald eagle, an American symbol.

Mace of the US House of Representatives

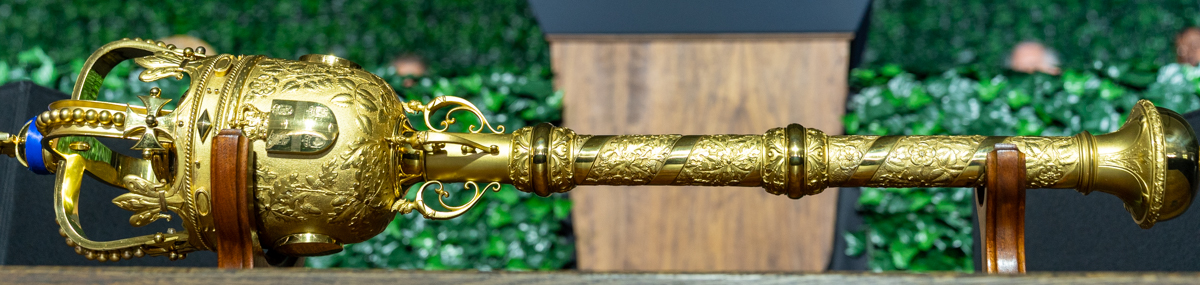
Mace of the Virginia House of Delegates

The civic maces of the 18th century follow the British type with monarchical imagery, with some modifications in shape and ornamentation, while later maces incorporated either republican or imperial Roman imagery.

The current Mace of the United States House of Representatives has been in use since December 1, 1842. It was created by William Adams at a cost of $400 to replace the first mace, which was destroyed on August 24, 1814, when the Capitol was destroyed in the burning of Washington by the British during the War of 1812. A simple wooden mace was used in the interim.

The current mace is nearly 4 feet (1.2 m) tall and is composed of 13 ebony rods tied together with silver strands criss-crossed over the length of the staff. This design shows the staff with the appearance of a bundled fasces, sans ax, symbolizing unity, the rods representing the 13 original states. It is surmounted by a globus, symbolising dominion, and above that the American eagle with outstretched wings.

When the House is in session, the mace stands in a cylindrical pedestal of green marble to the right of the chair of the speaker of the House. When the House is meeting as the Committee of the Whole, the mace is moved to a pedestal next to the desk of the sergeant at arms. Thus representatives entering the chamber know with a glance whether the House is in session or in committee.

In accordance with the Rules of the House, when a member becomes unruly the sergeant-at-arms, on order of the speaker, lifts the mace from its pedestal and presents it before the offenders, thereby restoring order. This occurs very rarely.

Other examples of English silver maces in North America include one dating to 1754 at Norfolk, Virginia, and the mace of the state of South Carolina, dating to 1756, which has monarchical imagery. The Maryland House of Delegates also has a very old ceremonial mace, although it is the plainest of all, having no ornamentation save some carved vegetation designs at its head. The Mace of the Virginia House of Delegates also has monarchical motifs, though it was not created until the 1970s.

== Bands ==
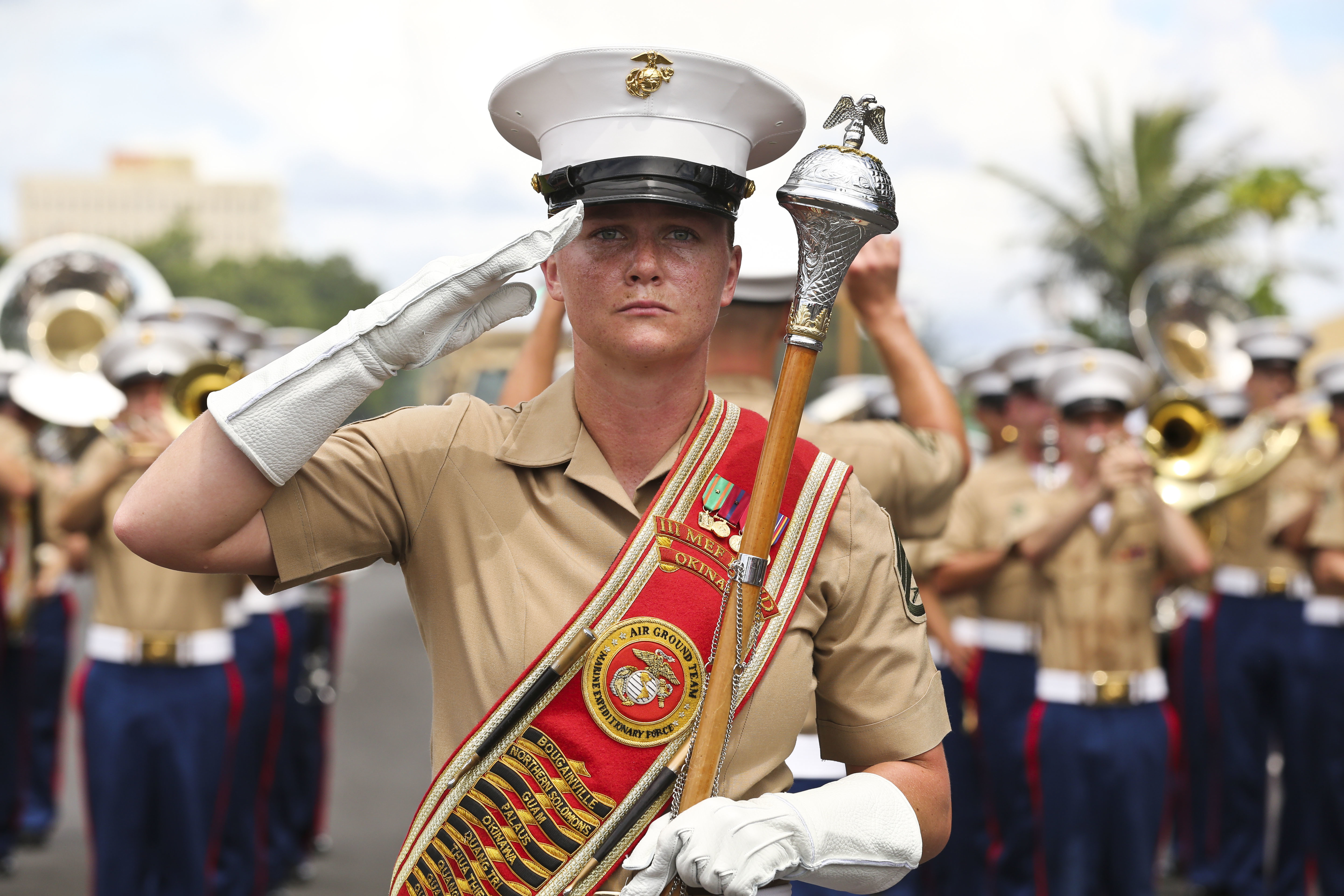
A drum major of the U.S. Marine Corps' III Marine Expeditionary Force Band is pictured carrying a mace in 2019

Drum majors carry a mace to convey commands or signals to their band. According to the Royal Scottish Pipe Band Association, "Drum Major’s maces have been in existence since the 17th century".

== Churches ==
Among other maces (more correctly described as staves) in use today are those carried before ecclesiastical dignitaries and clergy in cathedrals and some parish churches. Other churches, particularly churches of the Anglican Communion, a verger ceremoniously precedes processions.

In the Roman Catholic Church maces used to be carried before Popes and Cardinals. They have long since been replaced with processional crosses.

== Universities ==
Ceremonial maces, symbols of the internal authority over members and the independence from external authority, are still used at many educational institutions, particularly universities. The University of St Andrews in Scotland has three maces dating from the 15th century. The university also has four other maces of a more recent origin. These are on permanent display at the Museum of the University of St Andrews. The University of Glasgow has one from the same period, which may be seen in its arms. University of Innsbruck and its sister Medical University are in possession of maces from 1572, 1588 and 1833, which were confiscated by the Habsburgs from the University of Olomouc in the 1850s.

At the University of Oxford there are three dating from the second half of the 16th century and six from 1723 and 1724, while at the University of Cambridge there are three from 1626 and one from 1628. The latter was altered during the Commonwealth of England and again at the Stuart Restoration. The mace of the general council of the University of Edinburgh has a three-sided head: one with the seal of the university; one with the university's coat of arms and the third with Edinburgh's coat of arms of the City of Edinburgh. The wood for the shaft of the mace is from Malabar and was presented by the Secretary of State for India (R. A. Cross) at the First International Forestry Exhibition (1884). The mace of the Open University reflects its modernist outlook, being made from titanium.

In the United States, almost all universities and free-standing colleges have a mace, used almost exclusively at commencement exercises and borne variously by the university or college president, chancellor, rector, provost, the marshal of the faculty, a dean or some other high official. In those universities that have a number of constituent colleges or faculties, each college, faculty or school often has a smaller mace, borne in procession by a dean, faculty member or sometimes a privileged student. In 1970, Cornell professor Morris Bishop was acting as marshal at a graduation ceremony when a radical student attempted to grab the microphone; Bishop fought him off with the mace.

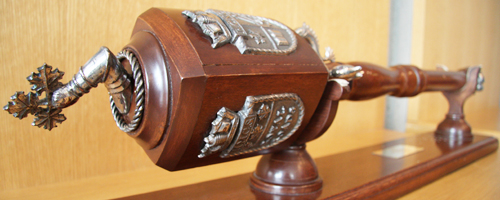
Royal Roads Military College ceremonial mace, on loan to Royal Roads University in Victoria, British Columbia

In Canada, some universities have a mace that is used as part of the ceremonial process of conferring degrees during convocation and other special events. The mace is carried by a special university official like a beadle.

In South Korea, Pohang University of Science and Technology has a mace as a part of its ceremonial functions.

In the Philippines, the University of Santo Tomas has a pair of twin maces belonging to the Rector Magnificus. These symbolize his spiritual and temporal power as the highest authority of the university. Made of pure silver and measuring 95 centimeters by 15 centimeters in diameter, the maces have existed since the 17th century and have been used in academic processions ever since. Candidates for doctoral degrees were accompanied by the Rector in a parade called Paseo de los Doctores from Intramuros to Santo Domingo Church, where University commencement exercises were held until the 17th century. Today, faculty members hold processions at the opening of each academic year and during solemn investitures in academic gowns, following the style of Spanish academic regalia. The maces, carried by beadles or macebearers, were included in the parade for their academic symbolism.

== Other maces ==
- The mace of the Cork guilds, made by Robert Goble of Cork in 1696 for the associated guilds of which he had been master, is in the Victoria and Albert Museum. The museum also has a large silver mace dating to the middle of the 18th century, with the arms of Pope Benedict XIV. This mace is said to have been used at the coronation of Napoleon as King of the Napoleonic Kingdom of Italy at Milan in 1805.
- Hetmans of Ukrainian Cossacks also had a ceremonial mace, called a bulava.

== See also ==
- Baton (symbol)
- Ceremonial weapon
- Sceptre
- Staff of office
- Fasces
- Heraldry
- Bulawa
