= 2018 Speaker of the Philippine House of Representatives election =

42nd speakership election in the Philippine House of Representatives

- July 23, 2018
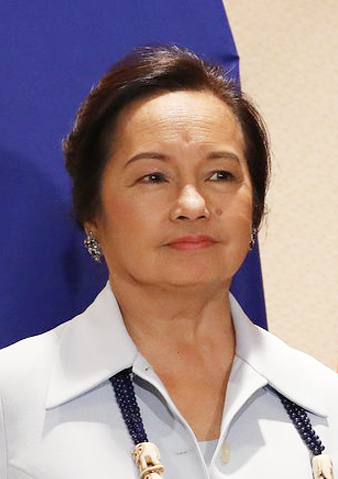
| | Majority party |
|---|---|
| Candidate | Gloria Macapagal Arroyo |
| Party | PDP–Laban |
| Leader's seat | Pampanga–2nd |
| House vote | 184 |
| Percentage | 92.5% |
Speaker before election
Pantaleon Alvarez
PDP–Laban
Elected Speaker
Gloria Macapagal Arroyo
PDP–Laban

On July 23, 2018, members of the Philippine House of Representatives held an intra-term election for speaker of the House during the third regular session of the 17th Congress. Former president and incumbent Pampanga 2nd district representative Gloria Macapagal Arroyo was elected speaker, replacing Pantaleon Alvarez, who had held the position since the opening of the Congress in 2016.

Arroyo became the 25th speaker of the House and the first woman in Philippine history to hold the position.

== Background ==
=== Speakership of Pantaleon Alvarez ===
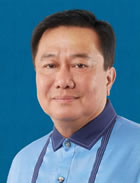
Pantaleon Alvarez

Pantaleon Alvarez was elected speaker of the House of Representatives at the opening of the 17th Congress on July 25, 2016. A member of the ruling party PDP–Laban, he was among the key allies of President Rodrigo Duterte in Congress. Under his leadership, the House pursued the administration's legislative agenda, including tax reform, infrastructure development, and the proposed transition to a federal system of government.

Alvarez maintained a majority coalition throughout the first two regular sessions of the 17th Congress. However, disagreements between him and several political figures associated with the administration emerged during his speakership, including a public dispute with the president's daughter, Davao City Mayor Sara Duterte, in February 2018.

==== Rift with Sara Duterte ====
Tensions between Alvarez and Sara Duterte emerged in February 2018 following the formation of Hugpong ng Pagbabago (HNP), a regional political party established by Duterte and four governors from the Davao Region. The party was organized separately from PDP–Laban.

The younger Duterte publicly criticized Alvarez after reports that he had described her as part of the political opposition for establishing the regional party. She questioned his characterization, maintaining that HNP had the approval of the president, and called on members of the House to seek his removal as speaker. Alvarez denied describing her as a member of the opposition, stating that she belonged to the administration.

The disagreement became a recurring subject of political discussion in the months preceding the change in House leadership. Reports later linked the rift to efforts to replace Alvarez, with Mayor Duterte reportedly supporting his removal.

=== Calls for leadership change ===
Efforts to replace Alvarez intensified in the months preceding the opening of the third regular session of the 17th Congress. Former president and Pampanga 2nd district representative Gloria Macapagal Arroyo emerged as a potential successor, with several lawmakers expressing support for her potential speakership bid.

On July 23, 2018, a manifesto endorsing Arroyo for speaker circulated among members of the House. Its signatories described the need for a more dynamic chamber and credible leadership capable of guiding national discussions on important issues, particularly the proposed restructuring of the government through federalism. At least 161 members were reported to have signed the manifesto.

The leadership change coincided with the opening of the third regular session and President Duterte's third State of the Nation Address (SONA). Arroyo's supporters moved to replace Alvarez before the President's address, leading to a series of parliamentary proceedings throughout the day.

== Election ==
=== Initial installation of Arroyo ===
On the morning of July 23, 2018, Alvarez presided over the opening of the third regular session of the 17th Congress. Following the session, lawmakers supporting Arroyo moved to organize a change in House leadership.

A group of representatives gathered in the House plenary hall and proceeded with an informal assembly to declare their support for Arroyo. Without a formal roll-call vote, the group announced the replacement of Alvarez and installed Arroyo as the new speaker. She subsequently took her oath of office and assumed the speaker's rostrum shortly before President Duterte's SONA.

The initial installation was questioned by several lawmakers, particularly over the absence of the House mace and the lack of a recorded vote. The proceedings were also disputed by members who continued to recognize Alvarez as speaker.

=== 2018 State of the Nation Address ===
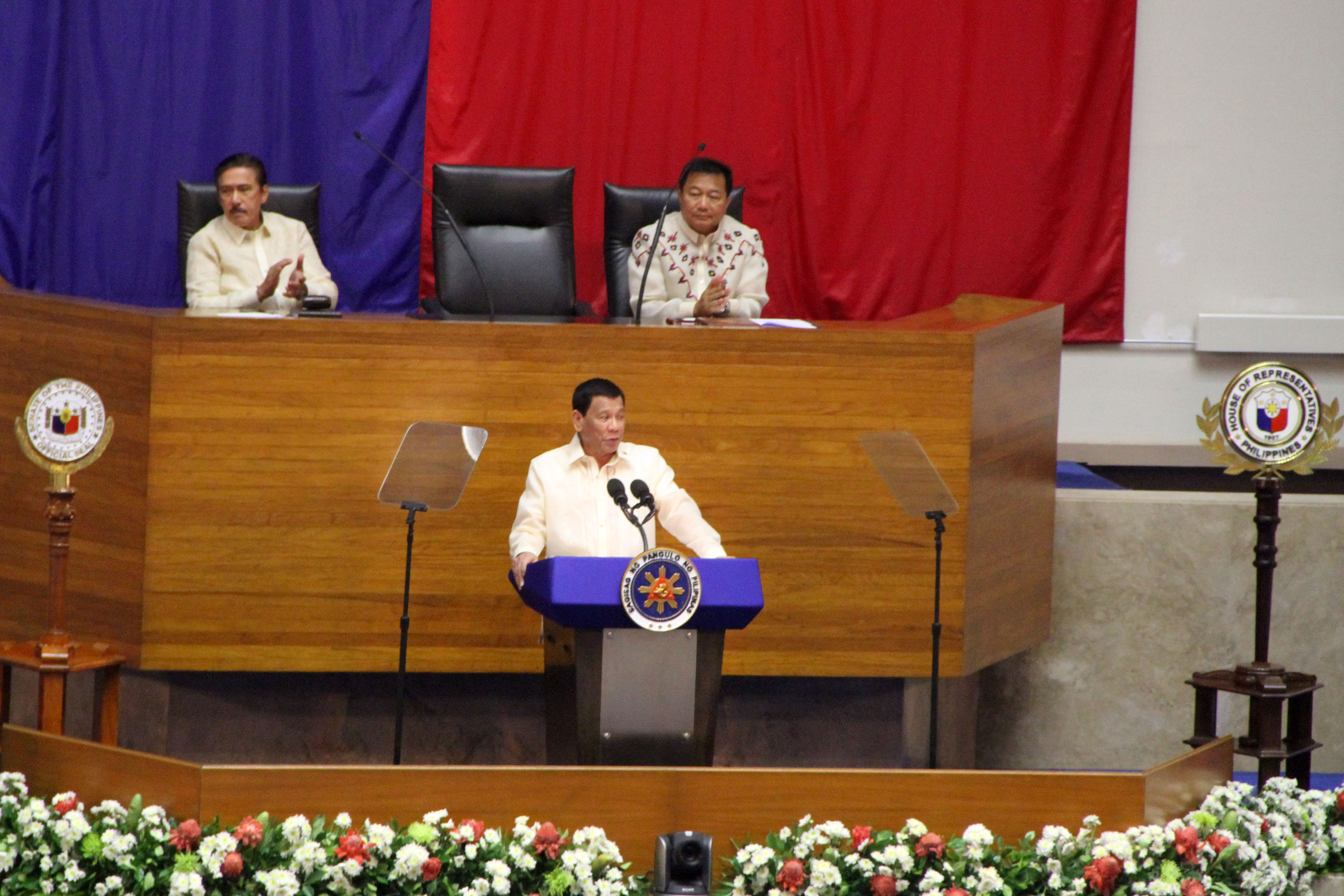
President Rodrigo Duterte (center) delivers his State of the Nation Address.

Despite Arroyo's initial installation, Alvarez continued to preside over the joint session of Congress on behalf of the House for President Duterte's State of the Nation Address. He occupied the speaker's chair at the rostrum alongside Senate President Tito Sotto, who presided over the Senate.

Duterte acknowledged Alvarez as speaker at the beginning of his address. The President's arrival and scheduled speech were delayed by more than an hour amid discussions surrounding the change in House leadership, with him talking to Alvarez and Arroyo separately. The proceedings eventually continued with Alvarez presiding on behalf of the House.

=== Special session ===
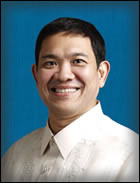
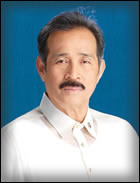
Representatives Rolando Andaya Jr. (left) and Fredenil Castro (right) served as presiding officer and acting majority leader, respectively, during the election.

Following Duterte's address, the House convened in a special session in the evening to formally elect Arroyo as speaker. Deputy Speaker Rolando Andaya Jr. called the session to order. On the motion of Representative Karlo Nograles, Andaya was designated as temporary presiding officer, while Deputy Speaker Fredenil Castro was designated as interim majority leader.

=== Nomination and election ===
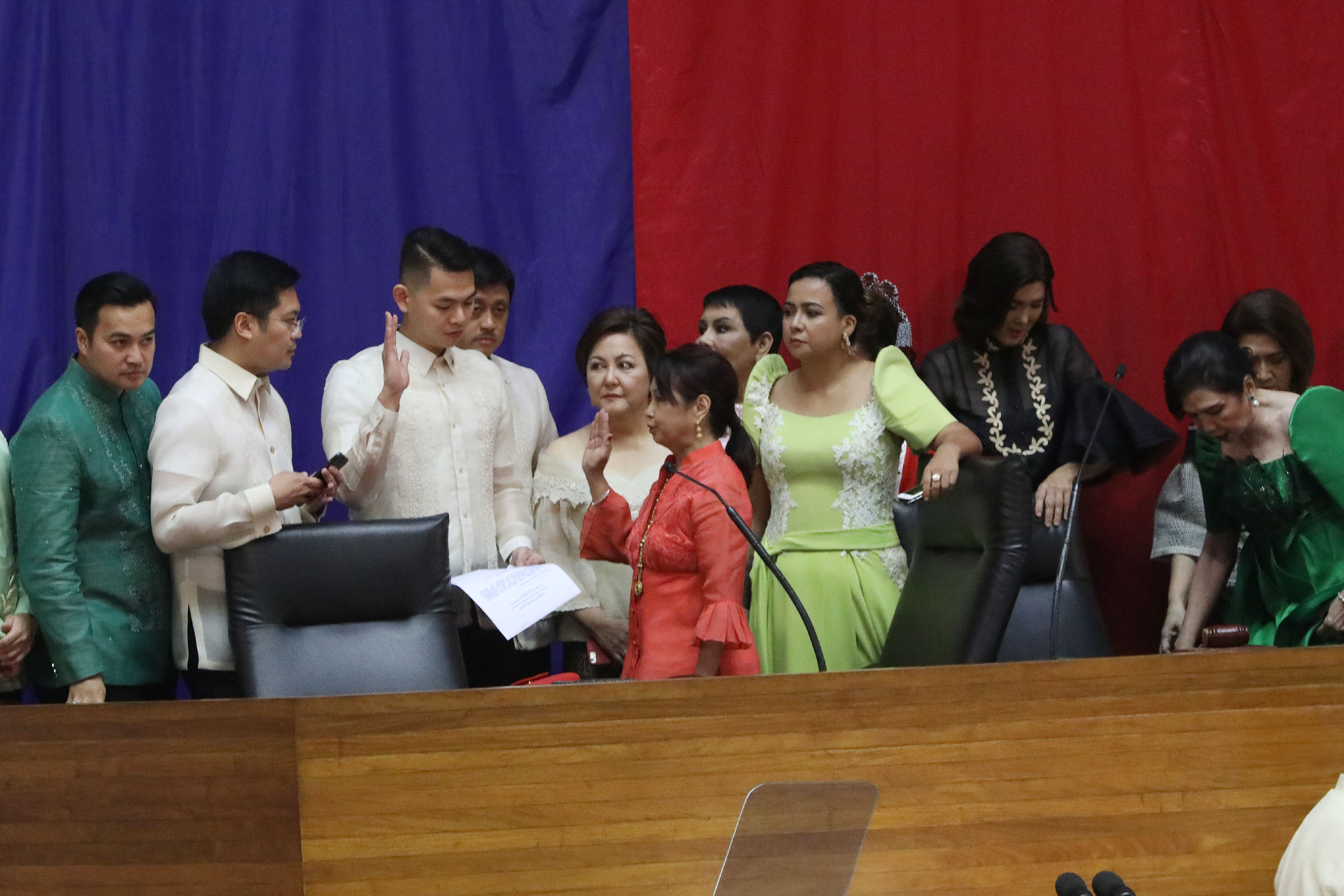
Former president and Pampanga representative Gloria Macapagal Arroyo (fourth from right) is sworn into office by Ang Kabuhayan Partylist representative Dennis Laogan (third from left) as the first female speaker of the House on July 23, 2018.

Nueva Ecija 4th district representative Magnolia Antonino-Nadres moved to declare the position of speaker vacant. The motion was seconded and carried without objection.

Deputy Speaker Raneo Abu subsequently nominated Arroyo, then representative of Pampanga's 2nd district, for the position. No other candidates were nominated.

The House proceeded with a nominal roll-call vote. The House Journal recorded 184 affirmative votes and 12 abstentions. Three representatives from the Makabayan bloc, Arlene Brosas, Antonio Tinio, and Carlos Isagani Zarate, cast negative votes. However, presiding officer Andaya ruled that voting against the sole nominee was out of order, stating that members could either support the candidate or abstain. The announced result remained 184 affirmative votes and 12 abstentions.

Following the vote, Arroyo was declared the duly elected speaker. Castro moved for her oath-taking, and Dennis Laogan of Ang Kabuhayan Party-list, the youngest member, also known as the "Benjamin of the House" of the 17th Congress, administered the oath to Arroyo. Leaders of political parties and the party-list bloc accompanied Arroyo to the rostrum. Arroyo became the 25th speaker of the House and the first woman in history to occupy the position.

=== Results ===
2018 election for speaker
| Party | Candidate | Votes | % |
|---|---|---|---|
| PDP–Laban | Gloria Macapagal Arroyo (Pampanga–2nd) | 184 | 92.46 |
| Abstention | | 12 | 6.03 |
| Against | | 3 | 1.51 |
| Total votes | | 199 | 100.00 |

== Controversies ==
=== Missing mace ===
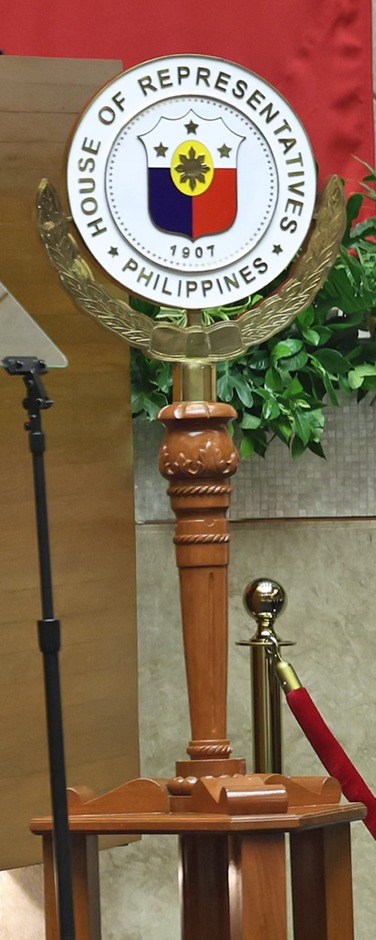
Mace of the House of Representatives

The absence of the House mace during the initial proceedings on July 23 became one of the main points of contention surrounding Arroyo's election. The mace, which symbolizes the authority of the House, is displayed at the speaker's rostrum during plenary sessions and serves as the warrant for the sergeant-at-arms in maintaining order.

During the evening special session, Antonino-Nadres requested that the mace be brought from the office of the speaker. When it could not be immediately produced, the presiding officer instructed legislative security to retrieve the mace displayed in the House archives. The session continued while the mace was being retrieved.

Castro argued that the absence of the mace did not invalidate the proceedings, maintaining that the authority of the House rested with the majority of its members. Andaya similarly described the mace as a symbol of authority rather than the source of the chamber's legislative power.

The mace arrived in the session hall while the nominal voting was underway, and its absence during the initial proceedings and delayed arrival during the formal election paved the way for questions from several representatives regarding compliance with House rules and the validity of the leadership change.

=== Recognition of the election ===
Questions were also raised concerning the conduct of the initial installation and the subsequent formal election. Critics argued that the earlier proceedings lacked the customary parliamentary requirements, particularly the presence of the mace and a recorded vote. Some lawmakers also questioned discrepancies between the reported number of members present and the number of votes recorded.

Although he had voted for Arroyo, Cebu City 2nd district representative Rodrigo Abellanosa requested a reconciliation of the attendance and the nominal vote. He noted that the announced attendance had reached approximately 236 to 238 members, while the 184 affirmative votes and 12 abstentions totaled only 196 members. The presiding officer directed the secretary general to review the records and reconcile the figures. The House Journal subsequently recorded a revised attendance figure following the inclusion of members who had cast negative votes.

On July 25, the House adopted House Resolution No. 2025, introduced by Andaya and Nograles, formally entering the July 23 proceedings into the official records. The resolution stated that 243 members had been present during the special session, constituting a quorum, and recognized Arroyo as the newly elected speaker. It also described her election as expressing the trust and confidence of the majority of the chamber.

The adoption of the resolution was not without objection. Rodolfo Fariñas, who continued to identify himself as majority leader, questioned its consideration without referral to the Committee on Rules, which he chaired. Tinio also objected to the resolution. It was nevertheless adopted through a viva voce vote, formally recording the proceedings and the House's recognition of Arroyo's election.

== Aftermath ==
=== Concession of Alvarez ===
On July 25, two days after the speakership election, Alvarez publicly recognized Arroyo as his successor. The statement followed a meeting between the two representatives, their first since the leadership change.

In his statement, Alvarez acknowledged that the House had chosen Arroyo as its new speaker and called on members to resume their legislative work. He urged his colleagues to move forward, stating that the chamber should focus on its responsibilities to the country.

Arroyo described the meeting as cordial and said that both had agreed to maintain a good relationship. Alvarez's public acknowledgment effectively ended the dispute over the speakership and facilitated the transition to the new House leadership.

=== New House leadership ===
Following Arroyo's election, the House reorganized its majority leadership alongside committee positions. On July 30, Deputy Speaker Rolando Andaya Jr. was elected majority leader, replacing Rodolfo Fariñas. Andaya's election was moved by Deputy Speaker Fredenil Castro and was followed by his oath-taking before Arroyo.

Other changes included the appointment of Yedda Romualdez as chairperson of the Committee on Accounts, and Romeo Prestoza as sergeant-at-arms, replacing Roland Detabali. Dante Roberto Maling also assumed the position of secretary general, succeeding Cesar Pareja.
