= Mace of the House of Representatives of the Philippines =

Ceremonial mace

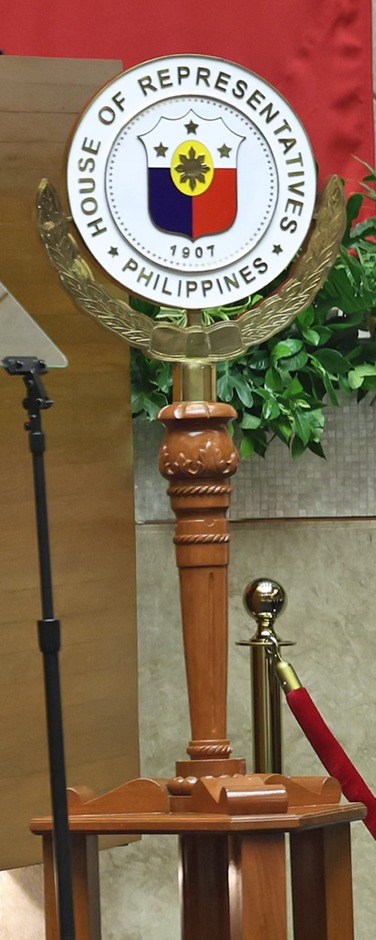
The current mace of the House of Representatives of the Philippines

The mace of the House of Representatives of the Philippines, also called the mace of the House, is a ceremonial mace used by the House of Representatives of the Philippines.

== Description ==
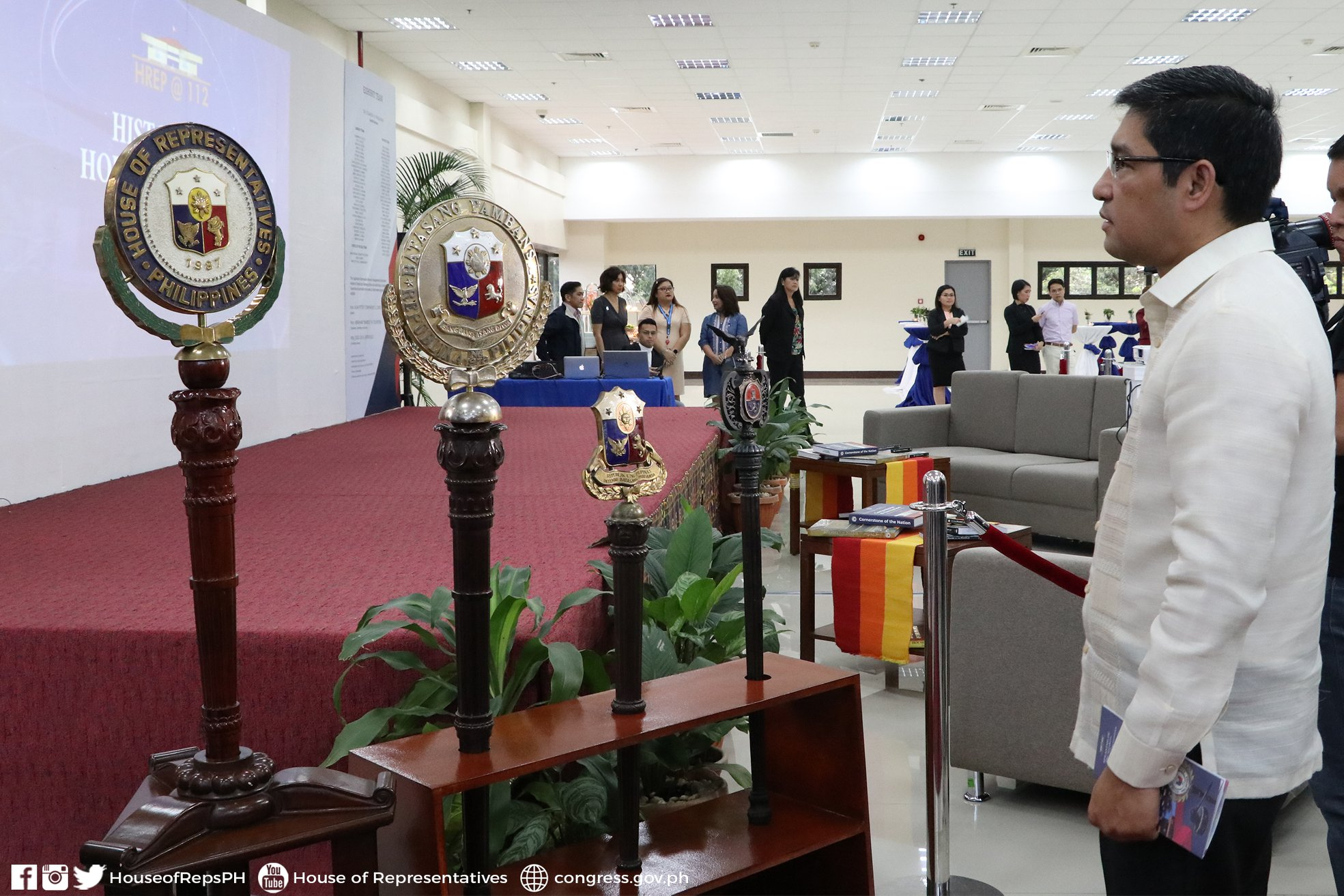
The maces of the Philippine House of Representatives (first and fourth from left) and the Regular and Interim Batasang Pambansa (second and third from left) as displayed in the Legislative Library, Archives and Museum.

The mace symbolizes the legislative authority of the House of Representatives. As stipulated in Rule XXVII, Section 165 of the House rules, it is displayed at the foot of the speaker's rostrum whenever the House is in session and is used by the sergeant-at-arms in to enforce order in the House upon the speaker's instruction.

The sergeant-at-arms has the custody of the mace.

The design of the mace consists of a wooden staff with the House's seal on the top. The maces used during the 1st to the 7th Congress and the Interim Batasang Pambansa used the coat of arms of the Philippines.

== Disciplinary usage ==
In accordance with the House rules, on the rare occasion that a member becomes unruly, the sergeant-at-arms, upon order of the speaker, lifts the mace from its pedestal and presents it before the offenders, thereby restoring order.

The mace was used to restore order on the House floor on May 26, 2004, during the joint session of Congress to approve the proposed rules on the canvassing of votes for the recently concluded presidential and vice presidential elections. This is after Maguindanao representative Didagen Dilangalen and presiding officer and then deputy speaker Raul Gonzalez had a verbal tussle when the latter refused to discipline an observer in the gallery who sent Dilangalen a note that says "shut up" while interpellating Senate majority floor leader Francis Pangilinan.

== Role in speakership changes ==
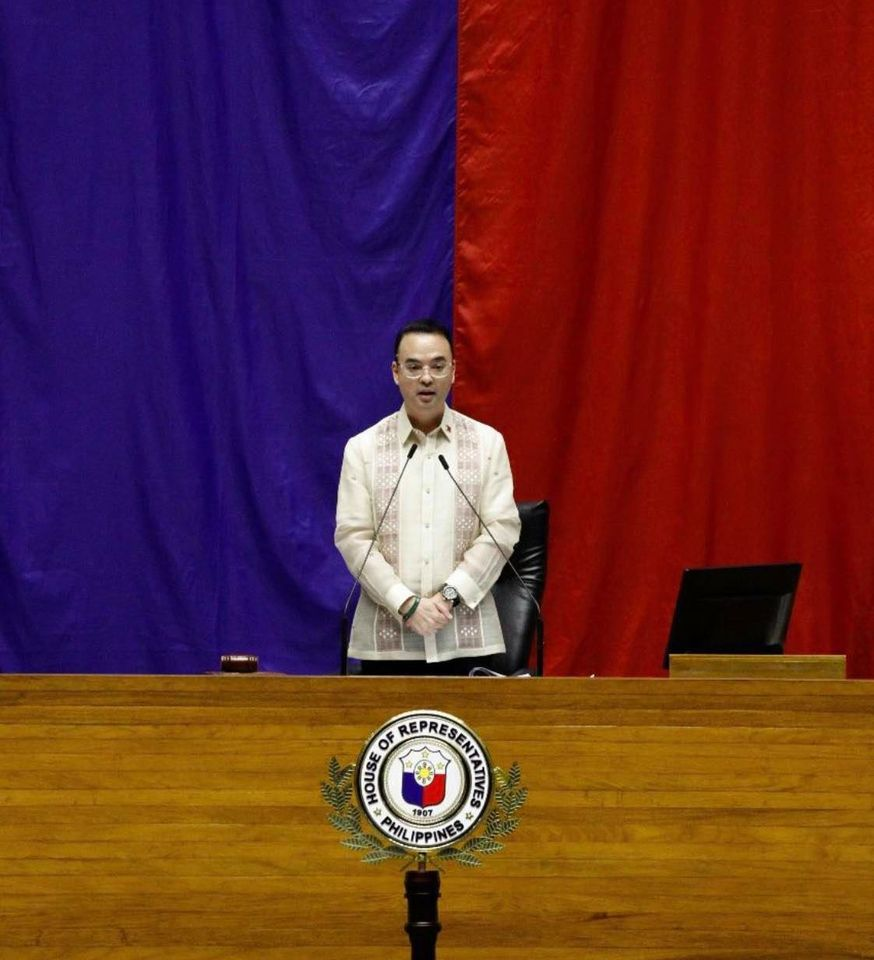
House Speaker Alan Peter Cayetano presiding a session of the House of Representatives. Below him is the old mace of the House.

The possession of the mace has been the subject twice when changes in the House speakership happened during the 17th and 18th Congress. The first was when Gloria Macapagal Arroyo was elected as speaker, replacing Pantaleon Alvarez, and during the speakership dispute between Alan Peter Cayetano and Lord Allan Velasco.

In the first instance, the mace was missing in the session hall when allies of Macapagal Arroyo tried to resume the session to formally elect her as the speaker, minutes after President Rodrigo Duterte delivered his State of the Nation Address on July 23, 2018. They instead use the old mace (used from 1987 to 2016) from the Legislative Library, Archives and Museum.

During the election of Lord Allan Velasco at the Celebrity Sports Plaza on October 12, 2020, they used a replica mace with the House's old seal design, which House sergeant-at-arms Ramon Apolinario called as "not the official mace". However, this was disputed by representative Rufus Rodriguez saying that it is "merely a symbol of authority and it cannot demise, cannot take precedence or acquire a higher legal authority over the physical warm bodies and those attending through electronic platforms." They also used the same mace during their session at the Batasang Pambansa the following day to confirm his election.

== See also ==
- Mace of the Senate of the Philippines
