= Seal of the House of Representatives of the Philippines =

- Armiger: House of Representatives of the Philippines
- Shield: Per pale azure and gules; a chief argent studded with three mullets equidistant from each other; and, in point of honour, ovoid argent over all the sun rayonnant with eight minor and lesser rays
- Other elements: 82 mullets Or encircling the whole

The seal of the House of Representatives of the Philippines is the seal officially adopted by the House of Representatives of the Philippines to authenticate certain official documents. The seal is of the Office of the House of Representatives and not to any members of the House including the speaker of the House.

== Description ==
The earliest known version of a seal used by the Philippine House of Representatives was in 1950, when the Office of the President commissioned the Philippines Heraldry Committee to create a seal for the upper chamber of Congress. The seal featured an illustration of the Old Legislative Building with the words HOUSE OF REPRESENTATIVES PHILIPPINES and OFFICIAL SEAL below, encircled by a dark blue outer ring with 51 stars representing the number of provinces of the country at the time.

From the 1960s until the abolition of the bicameral Congress in 1972, the House used a seal consisting of the national coat of arms with the motto VOX POPULI VOX DEI below the scroll, a fasces on its left and right sides, and an open book with a gavel on top. The whole is surrounded by the words HOUSE OF REPRESENTATIVES at the upper portion of the outer ring, and sampaguita bud garlands at the lower half.

The current seal of the Philippine House of Representatives was adopted through House Resolution No. 233 on September 23, 2015. The seal consists of the coat of arms of the Philippines without the scroll and inscription in the center. A ring of stars encircles the coat of arms representing the number of provinces comprising the republic. The year "1907" is inscribed at the bottom of the coat of arms, representing the year the first Philippine Assembly was inaugurated. Before 2015, the year indicated on the seal was "1987", the year that the current form of the House of Representatives was established after the adoption of the 1987 Constitution. The heraldic charges of the American bald eagle and Spanish lion were also previously present.

== Evolution of the House seal ==
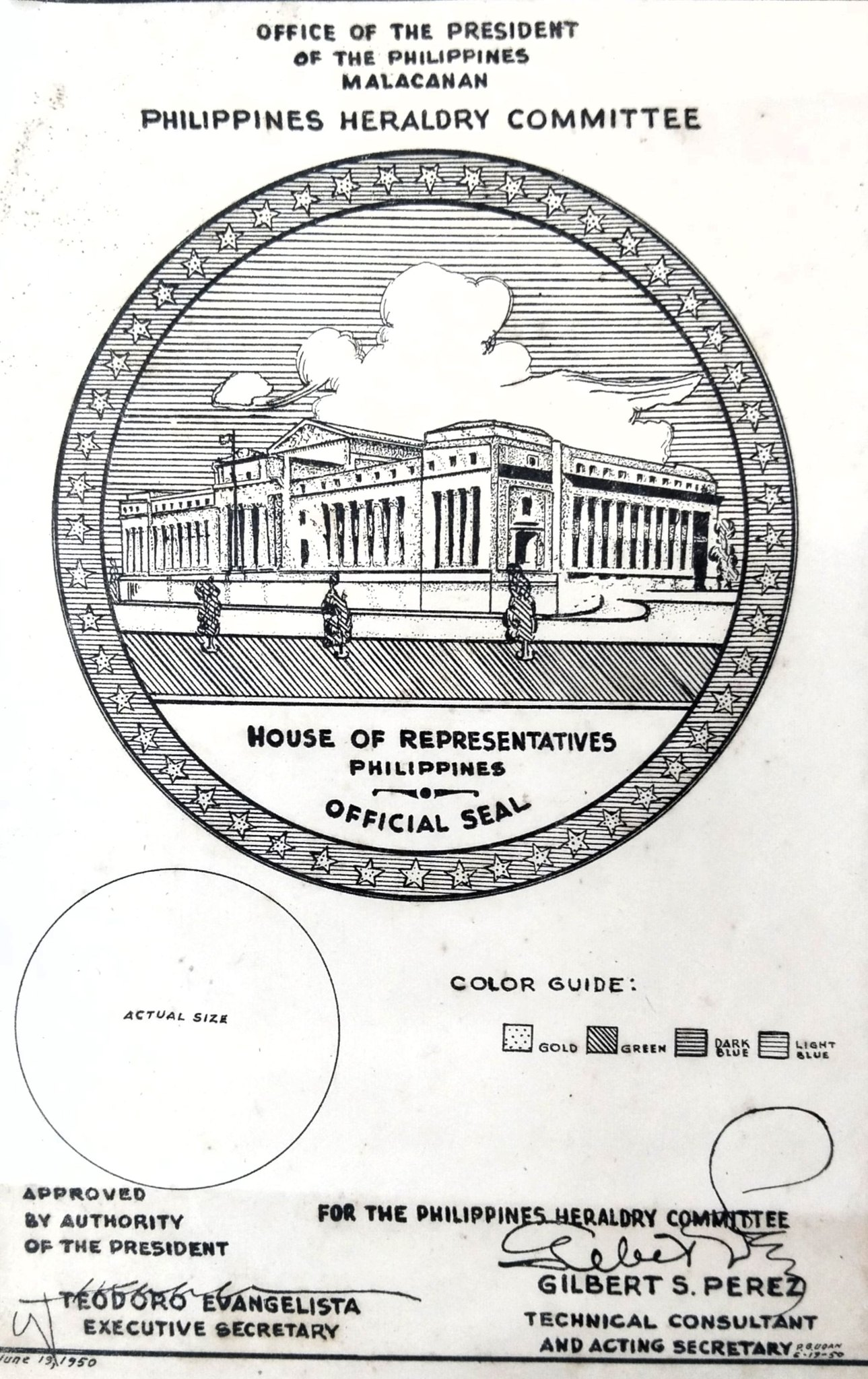
Illustration sheet of the 1950 design of the seal of the House of Representatives of the Philippines.

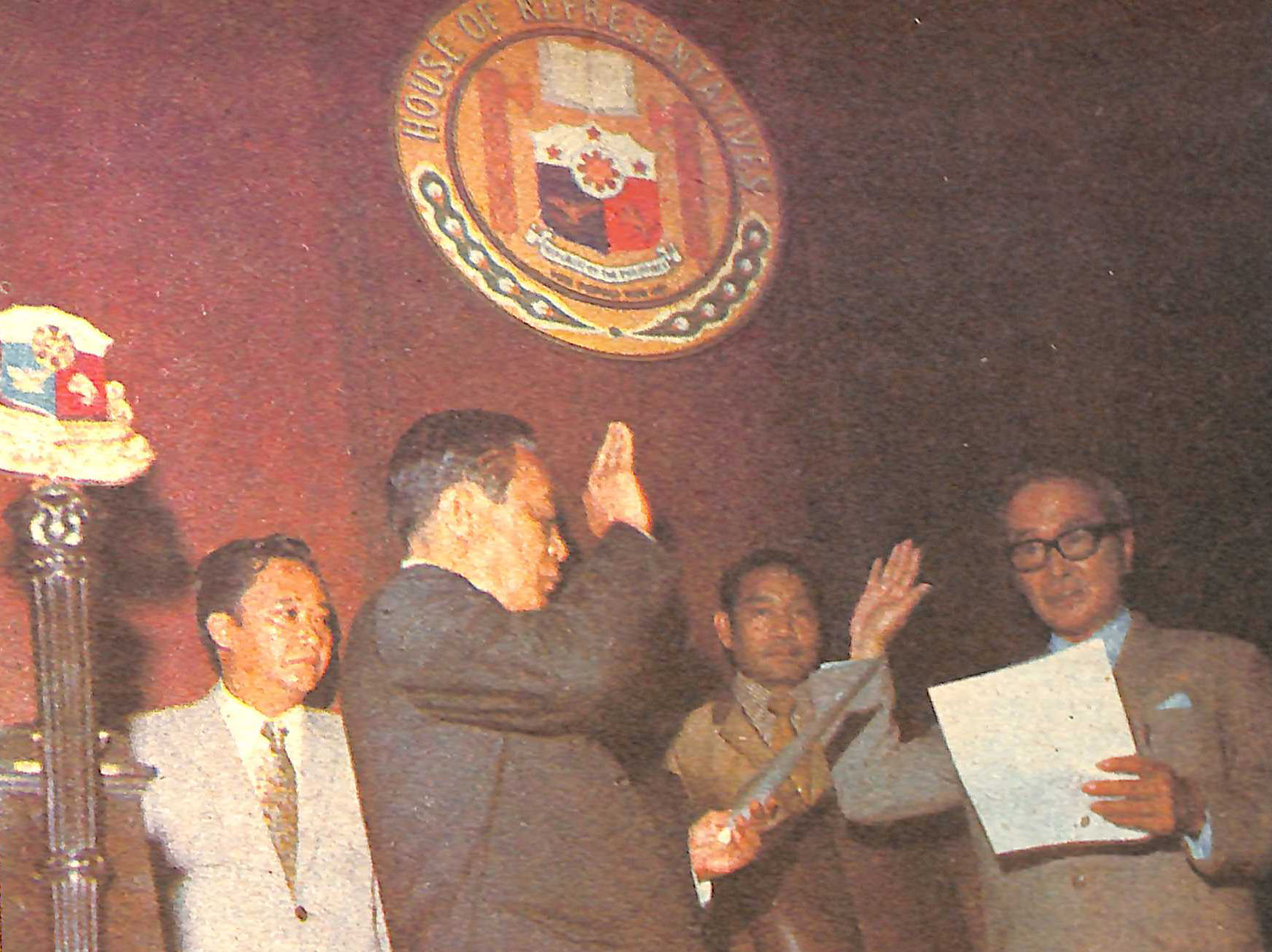
The official House seal as seen during the oathtaking of Representative Cornelio Villareal as House Speaker on April 1, 1971.

The seal design used before 2015.

== See also ==
- Seal of the Senate of the Philippines
