= Arrel Olaño =

Filipino politician

The Honorable Arrel Olaño
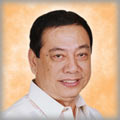

Member of the Philippine House of Representatives from Davao del Norte's 1st district
- In office June 30, 2001 – June 30, 2010
- Preceded by: Pantaleon Alvarez
- Succeeded by: Antonio Rafael Del Rosario

Personal details
- Born: May 3, 1943 (age 83) Tagum, Davao, Philippines
- Party: Lakas–CMD
- Occupation: Politician
- Profession: Accountant
- Criminal information
- Status: Convicted, with a motion for reconsideration denied; current incarceration status unreported
- Convictions: 3 counts of graft, 3 counts of malversation, and 1 count of direct bribery
- Penalty: 40 to 75 years of imprisonment

Arrel Reyes Olaño (born May 3, 1943) is a Filipino politician. He has been elected to three terms as a member of the House of Representatives of the Philippines, representing the First District of Davao del Norte. First elected in 2001, he was re-elected in 2004 and 2007. Olaño is also a certified public accountant.

In June 2023, Olaño was found guilty by the Sandiganbayan of three counts of graft, three counts of malversation, and one count of direct bribery in connection with the pork barrel scam. Alongside his co-accused, he was accused of diverting his share of the Priority Development Assistance Fund, totaling ₱1.89 million, ₱4 million, and ₱2.5 million, to non-governmental organizations associated with Janet Lim-Napoles for fictitious projects in 2007. The court sentenced him to imprisonment for durations ranging from 6 to 10 years for each graft case, 6 to 12 years for each malversation case, and 4 to 9 years for the direct bribery case. He filed a motion for reconsideration but it was denied by the court in October 2023.

House of Representatives of the Philippines
Preceded by Pantaleon Alvarez	Member of the Philippine House of Representatives from Davao del Norte's 1st district 2001–2010	Succeeded by Antonio Rafael Del Rosario
