= Pantaleon Alvarez =

Speaker of the House of Representatives of the Philippines from 2016 to 2018

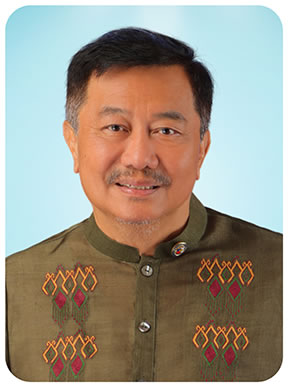
- Official portrait, 2022

Member of the Philippine House of Representatives from Davao del Norte's 1st district
- In office June 30, 2016 – June 30, 2025
- Preceded by: Antonio Rafael del Rosario
- Succeeded by: Oyo Uy
- In office June 30, 1998 – January 24, 2001
- Preceded by: Rogelio Sarmiento
- Succeeded by: Arrel Olaño

24th Speaker of the House of Representatives of the Philippines
- In office July 25, 2016 – July 23, 2018
- Preceded by: Feliciano Belmonte Jr.
- Succeeded by: Gloria Macapagal Arroyo

Secretary of Transportation and Communications
- In office January 24, 2001 – July 3, 2002
- President: Gloria Macapagal Arroyo
- Preceded by: Vicente Rivera
- Succeeded by: Leandro Mendoza

Personal details
- Born: Pantaleon Diaz Alvarez; January 10, 1958 (age 68) Pantukan, Davao, Philippines
- Party: Reporma (1997–1998; 2020–present)
- Other political affiliations: PDP–Laban (2015–2020); PMP (1998–2006; 2007–2015); NPC (2006–2007)
- Spouse: Emelita Apostol (m. 1986; ann. 2021)
- Education: Far Eastern University (BA); Ateneo de Manila University (LL.B)
- Occupation: Politician
- Profession: Lawyer

Pantaleon Diaz Alvarez (born January 10, 1958) is a Filipino lawyer and politician who served as the Representative of Davao del Norte's 1st district from 2016 to 2025, previously holding the position from 1998 to 2001. He served as the Speaker of the House of Representatives from 2016 to 2018. He also served as the Secretary of Transportation and Communications in the Cabinet of President Gloria Macapagal Arroyo from 2001 to 2002. He is a stern advocate to shift the current centralized set-up of the Philippines into a federal form, pushing for the establishment of an indigenous state in Luzon and an indigenous state in Mindanao. Initially in favor of an independent Mindanao, Alvarez changed stance when Rodrigo Duterte talked about a federal Philippines with him. In 2017, Alvarez proposed a new set-up to spearheaded federalism in the Philippines.

== Early life and education ==
Alvarez was born on January 10, 1958 to Eliseo Alvarez and Nicolasa Diaz. In 1978, he obtained a Bachelor of Arts (AB) degree from Far Eastern University. He then studied law and graduated from the Ateneo de Manila Law School in 1983.

== Political career ==
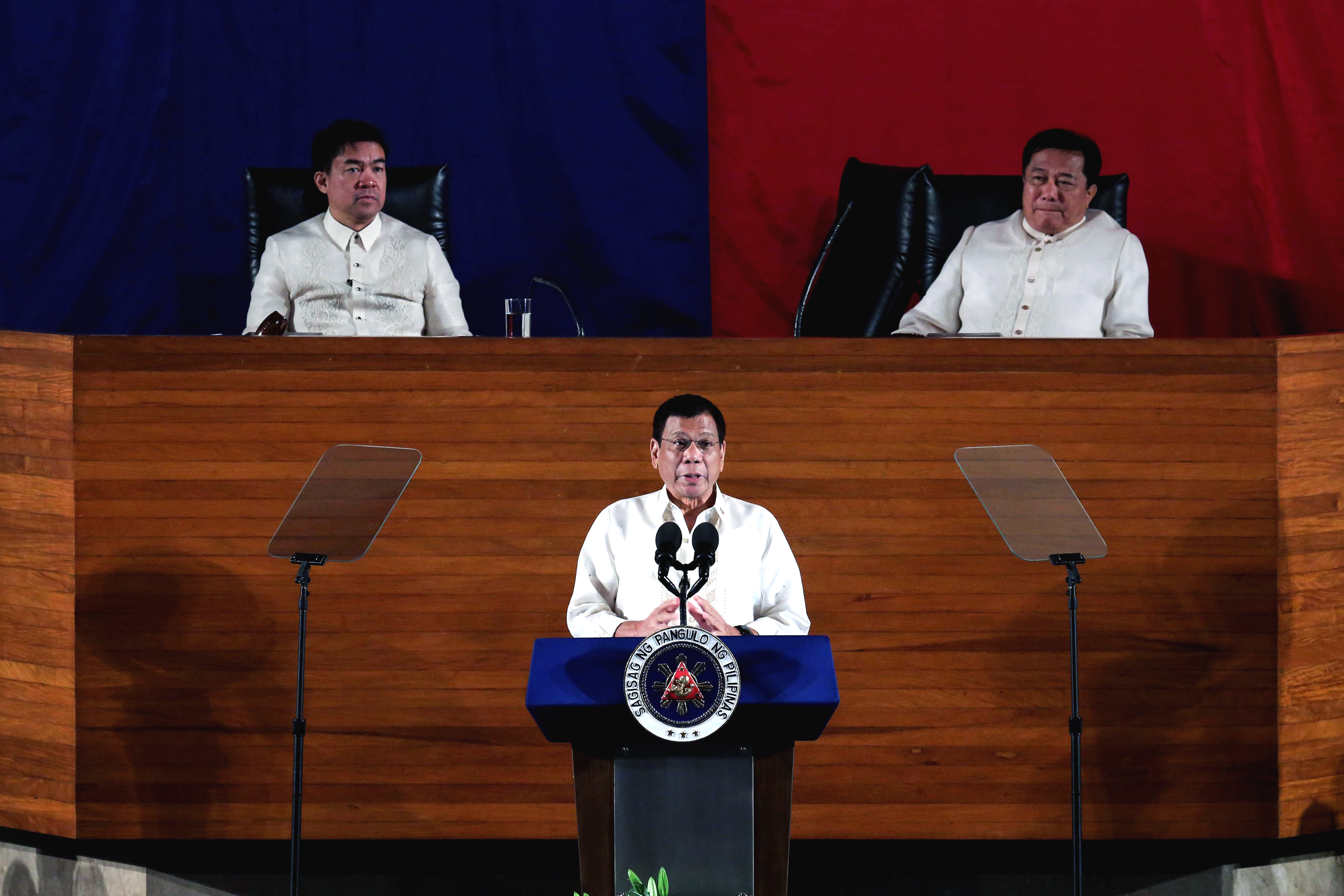
Alvarez (top right) during President Rodrigo Duterte's 2016 State of the Nation Address.

Alvarez was in private law practice from 1984 to 1986. From 1987 to 1992, he was a member of the staff of Philippine Senator Wigberto Tañada. He then became an action officer at the Manila International Airport Authority (MIAA). From action officer, he rose through the ranks, becoming senior assistant manager and chief operating officer of MIAA in March 1995, a position he held until September 1997.

In 1998, he was elected congressman from Davao del Norte's 1st District. He served as vice-chairman of the House Committee on Transportation and Communication and was a member of nine other congressional committees.

In January 2001, President Gloria Macapagal Arroyo appointed him acting Secretary of Transportation and Communications, where he served until July 2002. Among Alvarez's achievements were the adoption of the light railway expansion program, improvement of the Philippine National Railway, and computerization of the department and attached agencies. He also spearheaded the slogan "OKS na OKS sa DOTC" which means "Organisado, Kalinisan at Seguridad" (transl. "Organized, Cleanliness and Security").

In 2016, he was once again elected congressman from Davao del Norte's 1st District. On the opening of the 17th Congress on July 25, he was elected as the 24th Speaker of the House of Representatives with 251 votes. On July 23, 2018, he was ousted as Speaker and was replaced by Pampanga Representative Gloria Macapagal Arroyo.

Alvarez was re-elected as congressman in 2019 and in 2022. On November 15, 2020, he tendered his "irrevocable resignation" from PDP–Laban and joined the Reporma Party.

During the 2022 presidential election, Alvarez endorsed presidential candidate Vice President Leni Robredo, abandoning the camp of Senator Panfilo Lacson, who also ran for president. Robredo welcomed the alliance with Partido Reporma, headed by Alvarez.

Alvarez ran for vice governor of Davao del Norte in 2025 under Partido Reporma but lost to Clarice Jubahib and placed third.

== Issues ==
=== Alleged Graft in PIATCO-Fraport NAIA 3 deal ===
In 2005, Alvarez along with four other former Department of Transportation and Communications officials were charged with graft before the Sandiganbayan in connection with the construction of Ninoy Aquino International Airport (NAIA) Terminal 3. In 2010, the charges were dismissed by the Sandiganbayan Special Second Division due to lack of evidence.

Pantaleon Alvarez allegedly used information gained by his position to preempt the bidding process by creating a company called Wintrack which the board awarded a major sub-contract for the project's site development and excavation work. Alvarez and other member of the Piatco and Fraport became board members of Wintrack, benefiting and amassing profits from the deal. The staggering income gotten by Wintrack from the deal has prompted the Ombudsman to file a case of graft against Alvarez and his cohorts.

=== Prejudicial policy making and leadership ===
In finalizing the General Appropriations Act of 2018, Alvarez and his allies deliberately withheld infrastructure funding from the members of the House of Representatives who they found "undesirable". Alvarez stated that it was unfair for the members who cooperated with him and the President to receive funding less than those representatives. The total amount of funds reallocated to cooperative members was suspected to amount to ₱11 billion. When asked about the welfare of those regions which will be negatively affected by the reallocation of the budget, Alvarez was unapologetic and told the affected citizens in the regions to blame their representatives for the retaliatory budget cuts. Various members of the House of Representatives were alarmed and pointed out the dictatorial and vengeful nature of the Duterte administration and the alacrity in the leadership of Alvarez in perpetuating it.

Alvarez has threatened congressmen and various governmental agencies that they would receive zero budget if they didn't support Rodrigo Duterte's plans to supplant the Republic of the Philippines by implementing PDP–Laban's Federal form of Government. Alvarez stated that he did not care whether the provinces, agencies and local governments affected by his budget cuts would suffer and told the people to blame their representatives instead who refused to follow what Duterte wanted. Former Senator Aquilino "Nene" Pimentel Jr. warned Alvarez that "nobody stays in power forever", insinuating that Alvarez would receive his just deserts after his blatant abuse of power and authority.

=== "Persona Non-Grata" in PDP–Laban ===
In August 2017, Alvarez was declared "Persona Non Grata" by his own party mates in PDP–Laban, Rogelio Garcia and Cesar Cuntapay, stating that Alvarez actions in reorganizing the party nationwide without authority and recruiting new members in exchange for favors severely damaged the party's credibility and Duterte's own legitimacy in his war against drugs. Benito Ranque, PDP–Laban deputy secretary general, states that the new members are not even educated or informed of the party's constitution and by-laws, in support of Cuntapay's accusations. There were also reports that the new politicians that Alvarez recruited are "narco-politicians", involved in illegal drugs manufacturing and trafficking. Then-Senate President Aquilino "Koko" Pimentel III, PDP–Laban's president, however, denied the reports that Alvarez is persona-non-grata despite the numerous PDP–Laban members disdain for Alvarez and his insubordinate actions which violated PDP–Laban's own constitution and by-laws. Pimentel retaliated against Garcia and Cuntapay by ordering them silenced or be disciplined. Alvarez stated that "grumbling members" should either leave or he will "take care" of them.

=== Martial law in Mindanao ===
Alvarez was an advocate for the secession of all of Mindanao from the Philippines.

He is in favor of extending the martial law in Mindanao until 2022, the end of Rodrigo Duterte's term, citing the threat of terrorism and insurgency in Mindanao.

=== Abolition of Court of Appeals ===
Alvarez has threatened to dissolve the Court of Appeals and to disbar CA Special Fourth Division, Stephen Cruz, Edwin Sorongon and Nina Antonino-Valenzuela, for granting the habeas corpus petition of six Ilocos Norte officials under their custody for the investigation regarding the "Tobacco Funds" issue. Alvarez in a radio interview said, “They are not even our co-equal branch… They are merely a creation of Congress—that Court of Appeals. They only exist because they were created by Congress. Any time, we can dissolve them. So they better start thinking,”.

Alvarez has repeatedly publicly campaigned for the abolition of the Court of Appeals, stating that the said court only allowed lawyers to use delaying tactics and gives corrupt judges ways to abuse their power. He stated that in the federalism set-up he's proposing, he will create special courts that will allow him to dispense speedier "justice".

=== Influence peddling and "imbecile" Facebook post ===
A customs official accused Alvarez of peddling influence at the Bureau of Customs (BOC). Mandy Anderson, a BOC official, said that Alvarez had been using his position as a lawmaker to urge BOC commissioner Nicanor Faeldon to appoint Alvarez's recommendations. The accusation came after Majority Leader Rodolfo Fariñas scolded Anderson at a congressional hearing due to a Facebook status message wherein Anderson called Alvarez an "imbecile" for threatening to dissolve the Court of Appeals. Alvarez denied Anderson's claims, saying that he does not know the customs officers whose promotion he endorsed except through their résumés.

=== Marriage dissolution bill ===
Alvarez, along with 14 co-authors, had formally filed House Bill No. 6027, titled "An Act Providing for Grounds for the Dissolution of a Marriage". The bill lists irreconcilable differences or severe and chronic unhappiness causing the "irreparable breakdown of marriage" as the possible grounds for its dissolution. The bill prescribes imprisonment of 5 years in prison if spouse is forced to petition for "marriage dissolution".

After news of the filing, Alvarez's wife Emelita broke her silence and revealed her grievances regarding her marriage with Alvarez, revealing that she has long since known that Alvarez had been cheating on her countless times. That it was only during after he became Speaker that Alvarez had completely broke off relations with her. She expressed her longstanding support for him, having been by his side since 1988 and even campaigning for him in Davao del Norte. Despite the challenges, she emphasized the need to move forward in life. She also refuted her husband's claim that he's from the Manobo tribe, wherein polygamy is allegedly acceptable. She states that Alvarez was clearly a Catholic when she married him.

=== Impeachment efforts against the Vice President and Chief Justice ===
Alvarez has been known for facilitating and endorsing impeachment efforts against Vice President Leni Robredo and Supreme Court Chief Justice Maria Lourdes Sereno. Alvarez's endorsed impeachment complaint against Robredo came after the Vice President reported to the United Nations the state of the country and the War on Drugs that President Duterte's administration is currently conducting. Alvarez claims that Robredo's act of portraying the country in a bad light is a betrayal of public trust, and thus impeachable. Alvarez has also revealed that the congress will be discussing possible impeachment complaint against Chief Justice Sereno for meddling in the case of the Congress' detention of Ilocos-6, wherein Sereno granted the right of habeas corpus to the six individuals.

=== Death penalty advocate ===
Alvarez has been a staunch supporter of reviving capital punishment, despite the United Nations' moratorium on death penalties, even going so far as to threaten the "dismissal" of representatives who refused to sign the death penalty bill. Alvarez also advocates and encourages the killing of criminals, following the Duterte administration's zero tolerance policy on crimes and corruption.

=== Animosity against the Catholic Church ===
Alvarez has been a vocal critic of the Catholic Church for opposing the death penalty bill and the Duterte's administration's War on Drugs. This led to his calls for pro-death penalty Catholics to change religion, and to propose taxation of Catholic-run schools, despite its expressed exclusion in the Philippine Civil Code.

=== Close ties with Rodrigo Duterte ===
Alvarez, a longtime ally of President Rodrigo Duterte, became House Speaker right after the PDP–Laban reshuffled after the election results came out.

Since then, Alvarez has backed Duterte on issues, like the Martial Law in Mindanao, the postponement of Barangay Elections, and Duterte's War on Drugs, which he even promoted to the ASEAN.

There is general consensus that as long as Duterte is in power, Alvarez will remain a House Speaker.

Many critics have expressed that other than having close ties with the President, Alvarez is ill-suited for his position as a Speaker, due to his ineffectiveness in uniting the house to pass bills on critical issues.

=== Siargao land purchases ===
The Speaker has multiple properties in Siargao, a popular tourist town known for its surfing area, with Government records showing that he owns at least seven properties which have appreciated in value given the increasing popularity of the island. The Speaker, however, defended these land purchases, saying he purchased the properties years ago.

=== Mindanao independence ===
Alvarez have advocated for the secession of Mindanao from the Philippines. He reportedly held the stance as early as 2005 when Rodrigo Duterte, then the Mayor of Davao City, have advocates the Christian-majority portion of Mindanao to secede in the event President Gloria Macapagal Arroyo was deposed by a revolution or coup d'état. Alvarez have advocated an independence declaration "with or without GMA".

In November 2023, he proposed that Mindanao should push for independence if the national government continues to pursue its claim in the South China Sea dispute. In his opinion, pursuing the claim will drag Mindanao into an armed conflict if the national government continues its policy regarding China and expressed reluctance on the United States' commitment to side with the Philippines in a potential military confrontation. In January 2024, amidst a People's Initiative bid launched to revise the Philippine constitution, Duterte has said that Alvarez is planning to launch a signature campaign proposing Mindanao independence.

=== Sedition allegations ===
In April 2024, Alvarez called on the Armed Forces of the Philippines and the Philippine National Police to withdraw their support for President Bongbong Marcos, saying that his stance on the South China Sea dispute would lead to war. After his call was rejected by the military and led to an investigation by the Department of Justice for possible sedition, Alvarez apologised for his statements but denied that they constituted sedition. An ethics investigation was also opened by the House of Representatives over his remarks, which led to him being censured by the chamber on May 22.

== Personal life ==
Alvarez's daughter Paola is the current PDP–Laban spokesperson as well as an Assistant Secretary in the Department of Finance.

Duterte once jokingly claimed Alvarez is a Muslim, though there is no proof of such claim, and Alvarez admitted to have fathered eight children from three different women out of wedlock. Although legally married, he is in a relationship with Jennifer Vicencio.

House of Representatives of the Philippines
Preceded by Rogelio Sarmiento	Member of the Philippine House of Representatives from Davao del Norte's 1st district 1998–2001	Succeeded by Arrel Olaño
Preceded by Antonio Rafael Del Rosario	Member of the Philippine House of Representatives from Davao del Norte's 1st district 2016–present	Incumbent
Political offices
Preceded by Vicente Rivera	Secretary of Transportation and Communications; 2001–2002	Succeeded by Leandro Mendoza
Preceded by Feliciano Belmonte Jr.	Speaker of the House of Representatives of the Philippines; 2016–2018	Succeeded by Gloria Macapagal Arroyo
