= Speaker of the House of Representatives of the Philippines =

Presiding officer of the House of Representatives of the Philippines

- Ispiker ng Kapulungan ng mga Kinatawan ng Pilipinas
- Seal of the House of Representatives of the Philippines

- Flag of the Speaker of the House of Representatives

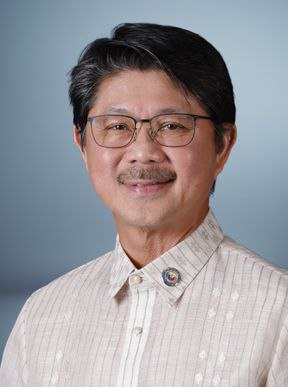
- Incumbent; Bojie Dy since September 17, 2025
- House of Representatives of the Philippines
- Style: Mr. Speaker (informal); The Honorable (formal)
- Member of: House of Representatives of the Philippines; National Security Council
- Seat: Batasang Pambansa Complex, Quezon City
- Appointer: House of Representatives
- Term length: At the House's pleasure; elected at the beginning of the new Congress by a majority of the representatives-elect, and upon a vacancy during a Congress. (Note: By convention, the Speaker is an incumbent member of the House of Representatives. As such, they are limited to three consecutive terms of three years each (Article VI, Section 7 of the Constitution of the Philippines).)
- Inaugural holder: Sergio Osmeña
- Formation: October 16, 1907; 119 years ago
- Succession: Third
- Deputy: House Deputy Speakers
- Salary: Vary from ₱325,807 to ₱374,678 monthly

The speaker of the House of Representatives of the Philippines (Filipino: Ispiker ng Kapulungan ng mga Kinatawan ng Pilipinas), more popularly known as the House Speaker, is the title of the presiding officer and the highest-ranking official of the lower house of Congress, the House of Representatives, as well as the fourth-highest official of the government of the Philippines.

The speaker is elected by a majority of all of the representatives from among themselves. The speaker is the third and last in the line of succession to the presidency, after the vice president and the Senate president.

A speaker may be removed from office in a coup, or can be replaced by death or resignation. In some cases, a speaker may be compelled to resign at the middle of a Congress' session after he has lost support of the majority of congressmen; in that case, an election for a new speaker is held. Despite being a partisan official, the speaker (or whoever is presiding) does not vote unless in breaking ties in accordance with the Rules of the House of Representatives.

The 29th and current speaker of the House is Bojie Dy, a member of Partido Federal ng Pilipinas from Isabela's sixth congressional district.

== Election ==
When the office of speaker is vacant (usually at the beginning of a new Congress), the secretary-general of the House sits as the presiding officer until a person is elected. A speaker is usually elected via majority vote via roll call of the representatives, after nomination at the start of each new Congress. Usually, despite the current multi-party system used, only two representatives are nominated, with nominations being agreed upon before each Congress during caucuses between the administration and opposition coalitions, with the chosen candidate of the majority coalition being almost certain to win by a large margin. The two competing candidates by tradition vote for each other; those who voted for the speaker-elect is assigned as the "majority" coalition while those who didn't are the minority coalition, with the losing candidate usually being named as minority leader.

In the 2013 election for the speakership, there were three candidates. Feliciano Belmonte Jr. was elected speaker over Ronaldo Zamora and Martin Romualdez. In this case, the candidates did not vote for each other, and the second-placed candidate, Zamora, became the minority leader and headed the minority bloc. Romualdez, who placed third, became the leader of the "independent minority" bloc. Only the majority and minority blocs were given seats in committees. There was a possibility that neither candidate would secure a majority of votes; it is undetermined what procedure would be followed in such an event.

== History ==
=== 20th century ===
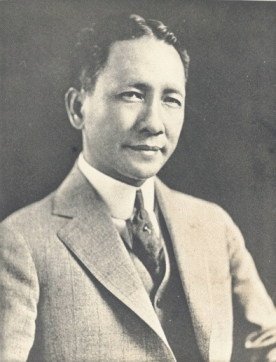
Sergio Osmeña was the first and longest-serving speaker.

The first officeholder to serve as the presiding officer of an elected deliberative assembly in the Philippines was Pedro Paterno, who was elected to the Malolos Congress in 1898. He was styled as the President of the Congress, which was the unicameral legislature of the Philippine Revolutionary Government and later the First Philippine Republic.

When the bicameral Philippine Legislature was established in 1907, Sergio Osmeña was elected speaker of the lower house, known as the Philippine Assembly, until it was renamed the House of Representatives in 1916. Osmeña resigned in 1921, and the power of the speakership was given to a steering committee of the House. Manuel Roxas succeeded Osmeña in 1922, serving from the 6th to the 9th Legislature, and was briefly followed by Quintín Paredes in 1933 after Roxas' ouster from the speakership.

The 1935 Constitution then provided for a unicameral legislative body, effectively abolishing the Senate, and succeeding speakers headed the National Assembly during the early years of the Commonwealth period and the Second Republic under Japanese occupation from 1943 to 1944. Gil Montilla was elected speaker of the First National Assembly in 1935. On the opening session of the Second National Assembly, future chief justice José Yulo was elected by the chamber as its speaker. The Japanese-sponsored Assembly during the presidency of Jose P. Laurel had Benigno Aquino Sr. as its speaker, until the republic was formally dissolved.

The postwar Commonwealth Congress first convened on June 9, 1945, with the House of Representatives electing Jose Zulueta as its speaker. The Liberal Party, composed of members from the breakaway liberal wing of the Nacionalista Party, obtained a congressional majority in the 1946 general elections and elected Eugenio Pérez as speaker. The Liberals lost their majority by 1953 to the Nacionalistas, with Jose Laurel Jr. becoming the new speaker when the 3rd Congress convened. Former speaker pro tempore Daniel Romualdez succeeded Laurel, who ran for the vice presidency in 1957, during the 4th Congress and served as speaker until he was unseated by Cornelio Villareal in 1962. Laurel regained his congressional seat in 1961 after his vice presidential defeat to Diosdado Macapagal and was re-elected as speaker in 1967. Villareal became the last speaker of the House upon his election in 1971, before president Ferdinand Marcos’ declaration of martial law effectively led to the dissolution of Congress.

In 1973, a new constitution was ratified, abolishing Congress in favor of another unicameral body later known as the Batasang Pambansa. President and prime minister Marcos served as presiding officer from the assembly's first session on June 12 until July 31, 1978, when former chief justice and Region IV assemblyman Querube Makalintal was elected speaker of the Interim Batasang Pambansa. Makalintal was succeeded by Nicanor Yñiguez of Southern Leyte upon the inauguration of the Regular Batasang Pambansa in 1984. After the 1986 EDSA Revolution, president Corazon Aquino issued Presidential Proclamation No. 3, which abolished the Batasan and vested legislative powers in the president.

When the House of Representatives was reestablished in 1987, Ramon Mitra, a member of Lakas ng Bansa (which later merged with the Cojuangco faction of PDP–Laban to form Laban ng Demokratikong Pilipino), was elected speaker.

Jose de Venecia Jr. led the House during the presidency of Fidel V. Ramos from 1992 until 1998, when he was succeeded by Manny Villar.

=== 21st century ===
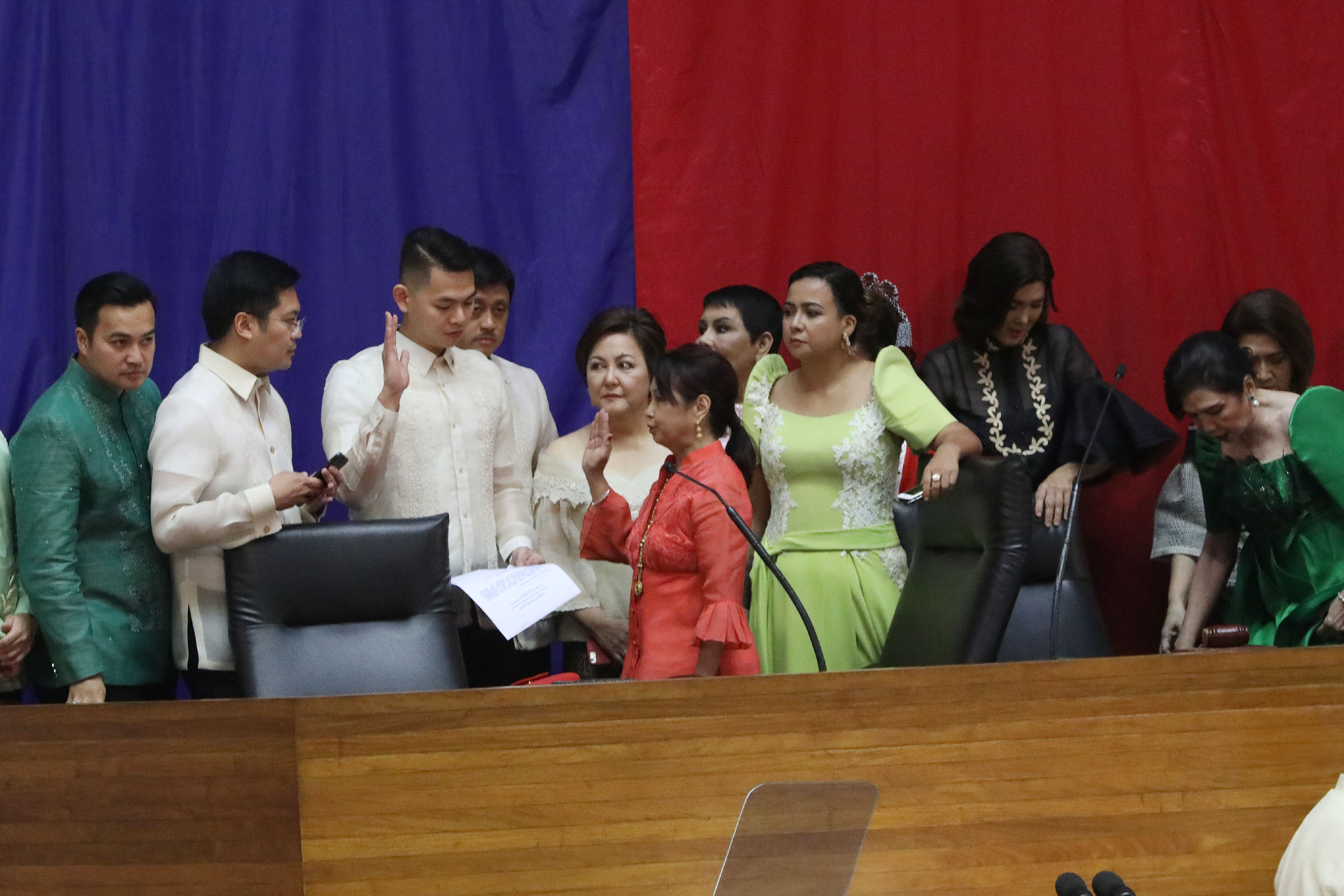
Former president and Pampanga representative Gloria Macapagal Arroyo (fourth from right) is sworn into office by Ang Kabuhayan Partylist representative Dennis Laogan (third from left) as the first female speaker of the House on July 23, 2018.

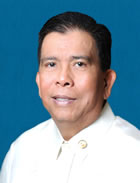
Arnulfo Fuentebella had the shortest tenure as speaker in history, serving for 72 days.

After the House impeached president Joseph Estrada, representative Harlin Abayon of Northern Samar moved to vacate the speaker’s chair, and Arnulfo Fuentebella was elected over Villar on November 13, 2000. Estrada was then overthrown by the Second EDSA Revolution in 2001, and the House was reorganized when Alan Peter Cayetano of Taguig moved to vacate the chair once more, leading to the election of Feliciano Belmonte Jr. as the new speaker four days into Gloria Macapagal Arroyo’s presidency. De Venecia was reelected during the 12th, 13th, and 14th Congresses until he was removed in favor of fellow Lakas partymate Prospero Nograles in 2008.

Feliciano Belmonte Jr., who became a member of the Liberal Party in 2009, was reelected as House speaker in 2010 and 2013.

At the beginning of the 17th Congress, Pantaleon Alvarez, an ally and PDP–Laban partymate of president Rodrigo Duterte, was elected by the majority of House members. He served until shortly before Duterte’s third State of the Nation Address, when the House informally convened to install former president and Pampanga representative Gloria Macapagal Arroyo as speaker. Arroyo became the first and only woman to serve as speaker, and the lone female to preside over either house of Congress. Alvarez disputed her appointment, as his allies adjourned the session to block the declaration of the leadership as vacant. The address was delayed for about half an hour while the president met with both representatives separately, resulting in an agreement that Alvarez would sit at the rostrum during the address, with Arroyo’s election formalized afterwards through a resolution. This marked the only instance in Philippine history where the speaker-elect who had taken the oath before the president’s address did not sit beside the president.

Alan Peter Cayetano was elected at the opening of the 18th Congress. Another leadership dispute arose in October 2020, amid the COVID-19 pandemic, when 186 members convened at the Celebrity Sports Plaza to elect Marinduque representative Lord Allan Velasco, ousting Cayetano. Cayetano questioned the legality of the session, arguing that no proper resolution had been adopted at the plenary to authorize a session outside the Batasan, that the official House mace was in the custody of then sergeant-at-arms Ramon Apolinario, and that an unofficial blue mace was used during Velasco’s election. A special session was subsequently held at the Batasan to ratify Velasco’s election by the same representatives who attended the previous day’s session, after which Cayetano formally resigned.

At the start of the 19th Congress, newly elected president Bongbong Marcos’s cousin, Martin Romualdez, was elected unopposed as speaker and retained the position in the start of 20th Congress. He stepped down as speaker on September 17, 2025 after being implicated in the controversy regarding flood control projects. On the same day, Bojie Dy was elected speaker of the House, succeeding Romualdez.

== Role ==
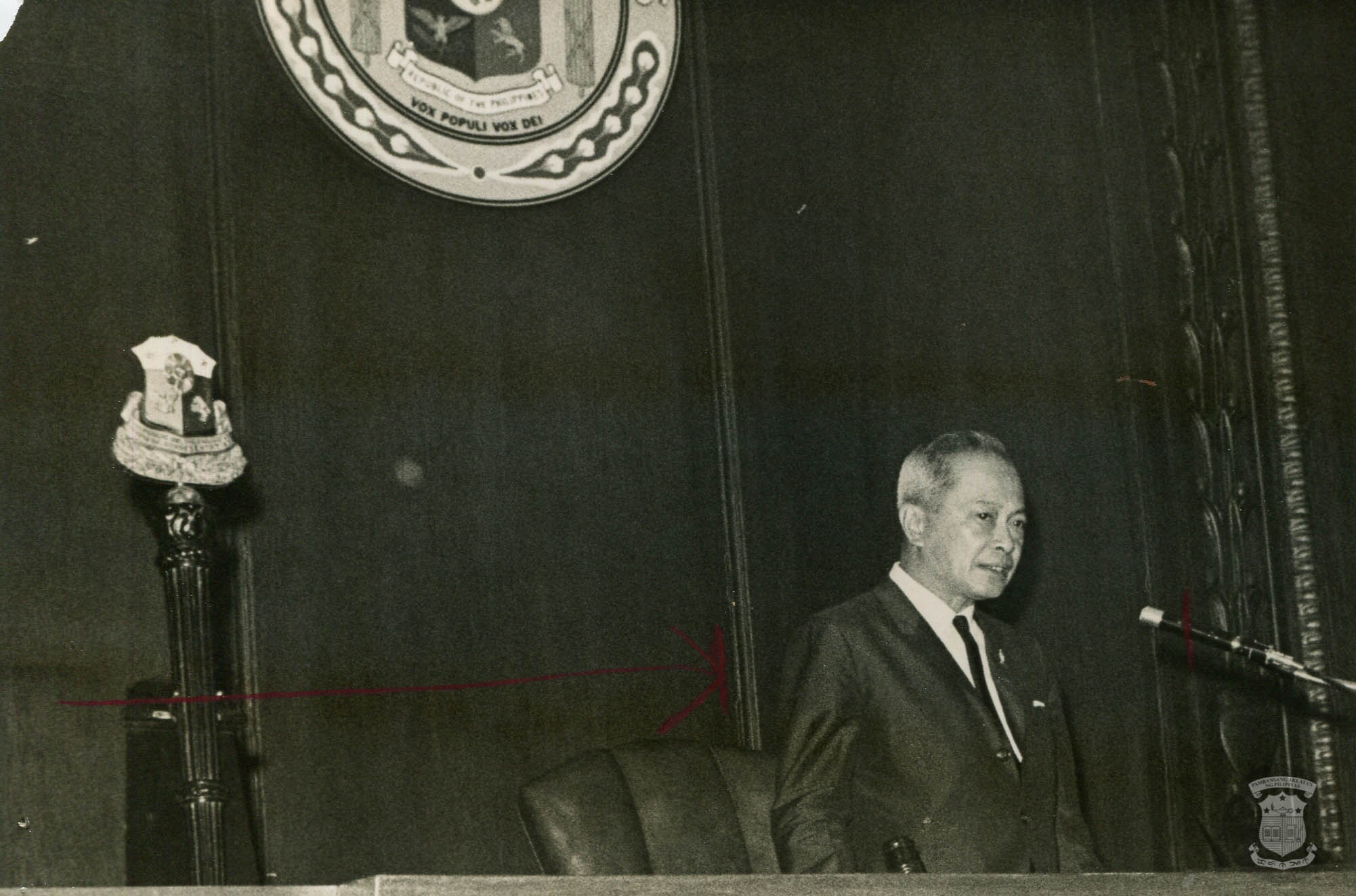
Speaker Jose Laurel Jr. presiding over a session of the House

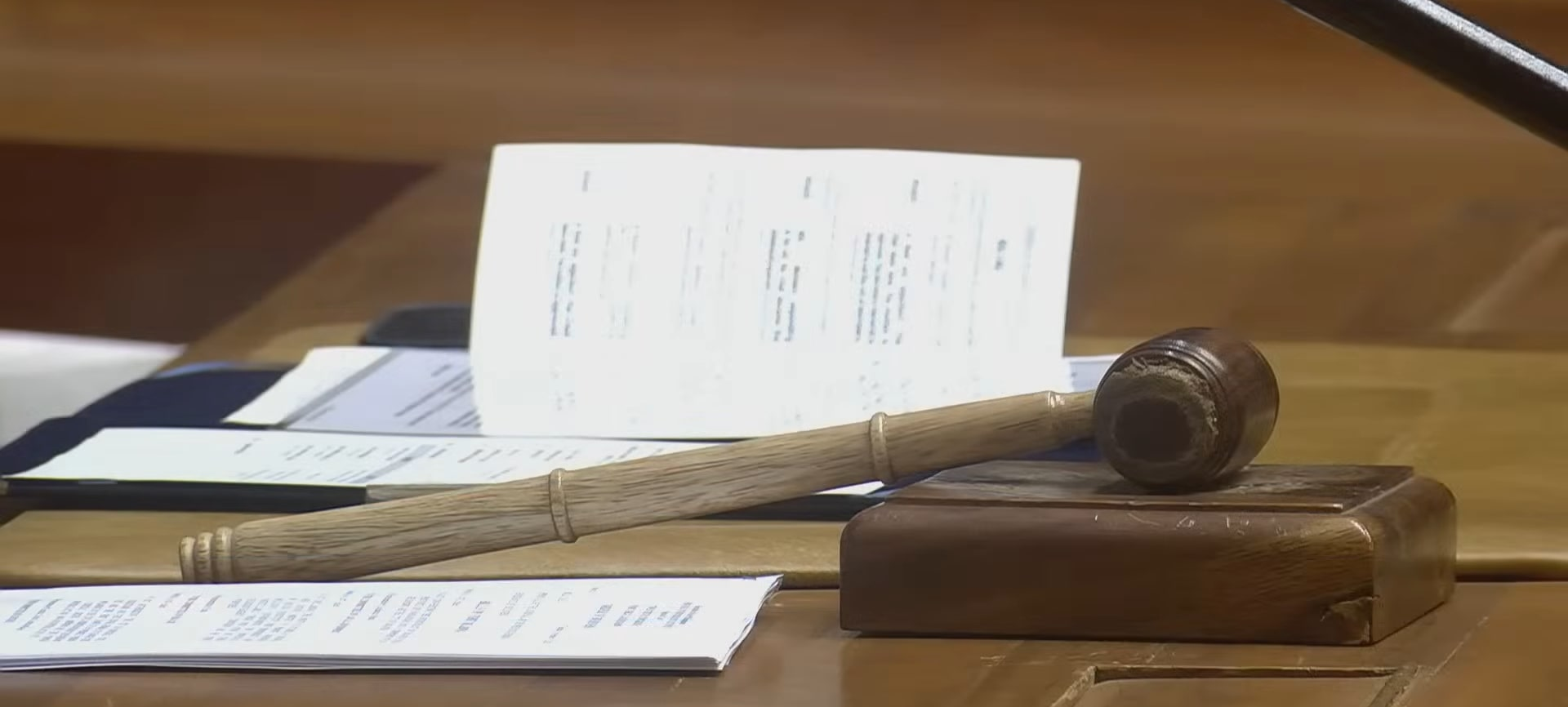
The gavel used by the House speaker as seen at the rostrum

According to Section 15 of Rule IV of the House Rules, the speaker of the House has the following duties and powers:

1. Prepare the legislative agenda for each session, ensure efficient deliberation and swift approval of measures, and coordinate with Deputy Speakers and committee leaders.
2. Conduct regular caucuses to discuss priority measures and facilitate dialogue among members.
3. Supervise all committees, hold regular meetings with committee leaders, and ensure legislative targets align with the House's agenda.
4. Establish an information management system to facilitate legislative work and public information.
5. Monitor and evaluate the performance of the House, its members, and committees.
6. Coordinate with the Senate to track and facilitate action on House measures.
7. Preside over House sessions, make rulings on order, and designate temporary presiding officers when necessary.
8. Maintain order and decorum within the House premises.
9. Sign official House documents, including acts, resolutions, and subpoenas.
10. Perform administrative duties, such as appointing personnel, imposing disciplinary measures, and managing budgetary and merit-based policies.
11. Prepare the House's annual budget with the Committee on Accounts.
12. Develop rules for public access to members' personal data and assets in consultation with the Committee on Rules.
13. Implement a drug testing system for House members and staff.
14. Require performance reports from committees and House officers.

Furthermore, according to Section 16 of the Rule IV of the Rules of the House, the speaker must "be the permanent head of delegation and representative of the House in all international parliamentary gatherings and organizations: Provided, that the speaker may designate any member to be the representative of the speaker. The speaker shall also determine, upon the recommendation of the majority leader, in consultation with the chairperson of the Committee on Inter-Parliamentary Relations and Diplomacy, who shall constitute the House delegation to any international conference or forum of parliamentarians and legislators and the secretariat support staff to be mobilized for the purpose.

The speaker also presides on the part of the lower house in joint sessions of Congress. In State of the Nation Addresses, the speaker is traditionally seated to the right of the president on the rostrum.

== Residence ==
The Speaker does not have an official residence in Quezon City where the House is holding its sessions but it maintains a residence (cottage) in Wright Park Road, Baguio City.

== See also ==
- House of Representatives of the Philippines
- Deputy Speakers of the House of Representatives of the Philippines
- Majority Floor Leader of the House of Representatives of the Philippines
- Minority Floor Leader of the House of Representatives of the Philippines

== Notes ==
Order of precedence
Preceded by President of the Senate; Sherwin Gatchalian	3rd in line	Last
