= Seal of the Senate of the Philippines =

Governmental seal of the Philippines

- Armiger: Senate of the Philippines
- Shield: Paleways of two pieces, azure and gules; a chief argent studded with three (3) mullets equidistant from each other; and, in point of honor, ovoid argent over all the sun rayonnant with eight minor lesser rays
- Supporters: On both the dexter and sinister, a garland with six sampaguita buds argent.
- Motto: Leges servatae pax fiat (Law Serves Peace, Let It Be Done)
- Other elements: 24 mullets Or encircling the whole

The seal of the Senate of the Philippines is the seal officially adopted by the Senate of the Philippines to authenticate certain official documents. The seal is of the Office of the Senate and not to any members of the Senate including the president of the Senate.

== Description ==
The seal of the Philippine Senate was adopted from the coat of arms of the Philippines which was approved on July 15, 1950. Other elements were added to the coat of arms to emphasize the legislative function of the Senate. A garland with six sampaguita buds are placed on both the left and right side of the coat of arms. The twelve buds represents the 12 regions of the Philippines at the time of the seal's adoption. The sampaguita flowers likewise symbolizes honor and dignity.

Below the coat of arms are the Latin inscription Leges Servatae Pax Fiat (English: Law Serves Peace, Let It be Done). 24 stars are encircled around the coat of arms representing the 24 elected senators of the Senate of the Philippines.

== History ==
Seal used prior to the 12th Congress.

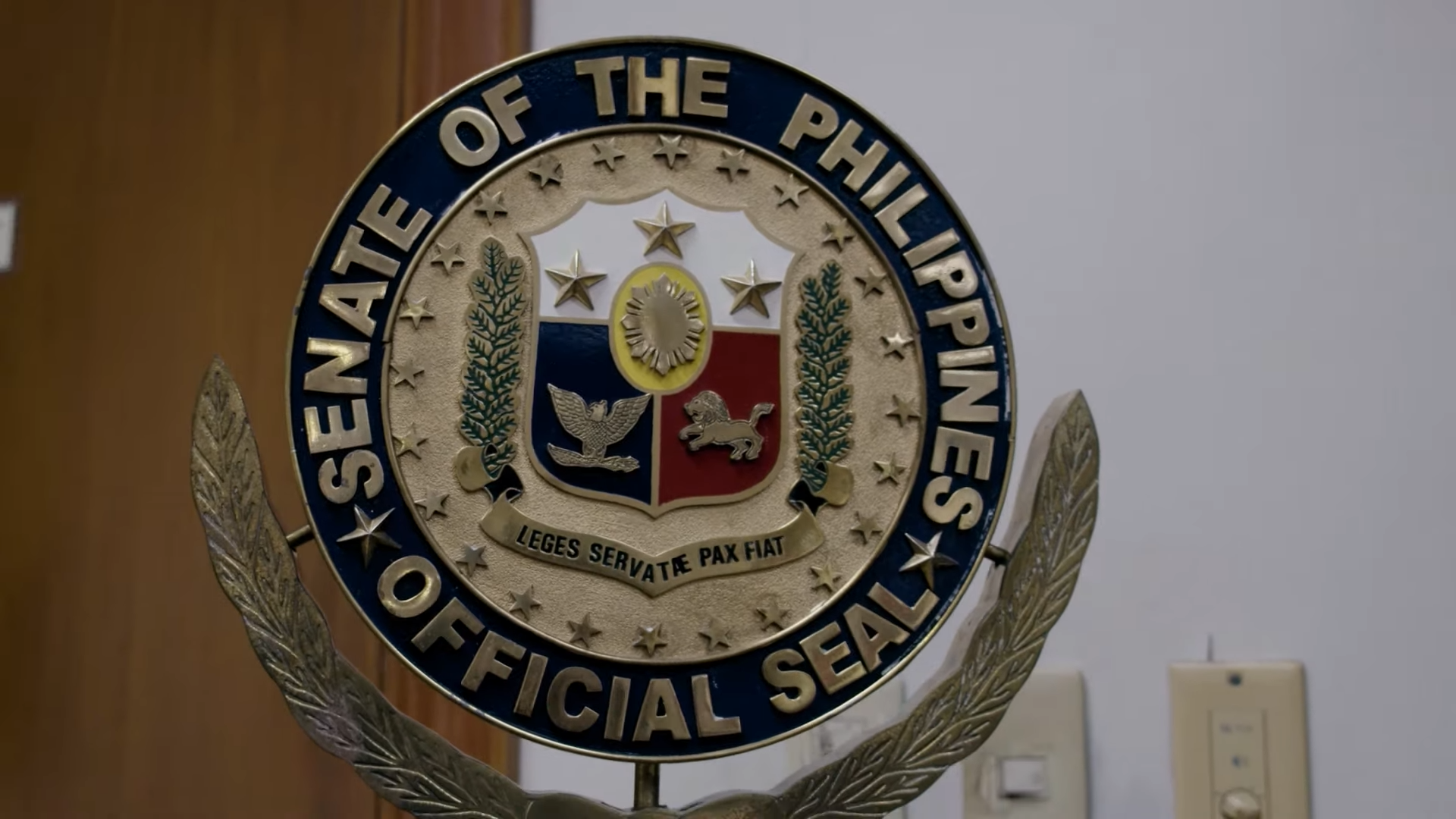
Close-up of the old seal of the Senate of the Philippines atop the mace used until the 12th Congress.

Since the reestablishment of the Philippine Senate in 1987, the seal featured an outer blue ring bearing the words 'Senate of the Philippines' at the top and 'Official Seal' at the bottom, separated by two gold five-pointed stars. The inner circle, colored light gold, included the same principal elements currently in use, but with the national coat of arms displaying the symbols of the country’s former colonial rulers—the American bald eagle and the lion rampant of Spain.

During the 12th Congress, the Senate adopted a new seal through Senate Resolution No. 15, which removed the eagle and lion from the coat of arms "to be consistent with the provisions of R.A. No. 8491, (Flag and Heraldic Code of the Philippines) and E.O. No. 292 and to emphasize Philippine Independence that the Filipinos had fought and died for."

The redesign of the seal also changed both the color of the outer ring and inner circle to white.
