= Typhoon Doksuri =

Pacific typhoon in 2023

Typhoon Doksuri (Egay)
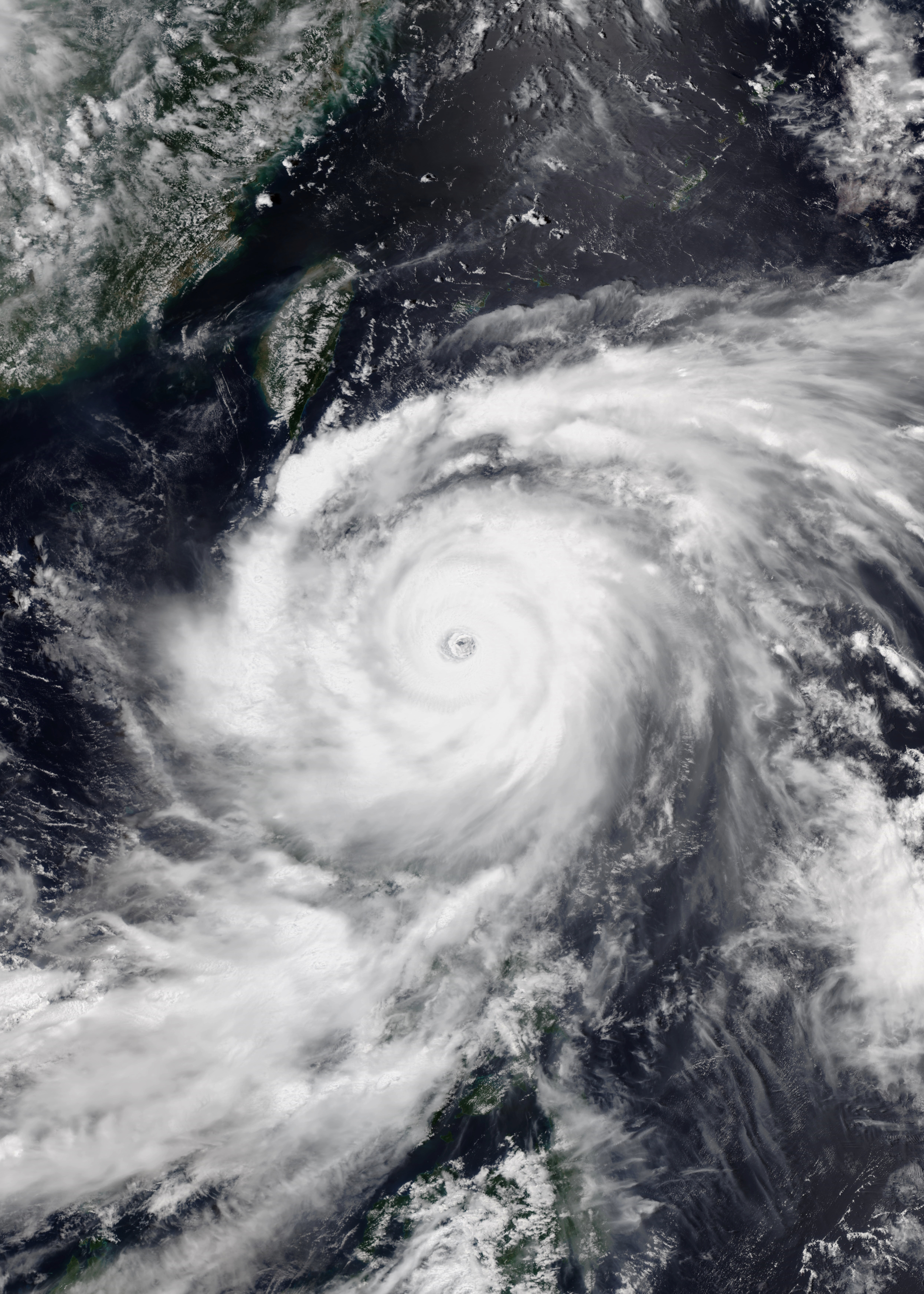
- Doksuri at peak intensity off the coast of Luzon on July 25

Meteorological history
- Formed: July 20, 2023
- Dissipated: July 30, 2023

Very strong typhoon
- 10-minute sustained (JMA)
- Highest winds: 185 km/h (115 mph)
- Lowest pressure: 925 hPa (mbar); 27.32 inHg

Category 4-equivalent super typhoon
- 1-minute sustained (SSHWS/JTWC)
- Highest winds: 240 km/h (150 mph)
- Lowest pressure: 928 hPa (mbar); 27.40 inHg

Overall effects
- Fatalities: 137
- Injuries: 289
- Missing: 46
- Damage: $28.6 billion (2023 USD) (Costliest typhoon on record; costliest in Chinese history)
- Areas affected: China; Palau; Philippines; Taiwan
- IBTrACS
- Part of the 2023 Pacific typhoon season

Typhoon Doksuri, (Note: The name Doksuri (Korean: 독수리, [to̞ks͈uɾi]) was contributed by South Korea and means eagle or refers to the Eurasian black vulture (Aegypius monachus) in Korean.) known in the Philippines as Super Typhoon Egay, was a powerful and highly destructive tropical cyclone that inflicted widespread damage in mainland China while also affecting the Philippines, Taiwan, and Vietnam in late July 2023. Doksuri became the costliest typhoon on record, inflicting an estimated $28.6 billion ($30 billion when adjusted for inflation) in damages, breaking the previous record of Typhoon Mireille in 1991. It is also the costliest tropical cyclone outside of the North Atlantic basin and the costliest typhoon on record to strike China, surpassing Typhoon Fitow in 2013. Doksuri was also the strongest typhoon to impact Fujian since Typhoon Meranti in 2016, and the most powerful typhoon to strike the province since records began in 1950.

The fifth named storm and third typhoon of the inactive 2023 Pacific typhoon season, Doksuri started as a low-pressure area in the Philippines, far off the eastern coast of Mindanao. Tracking northwestward, it rapidly intensified into a typhoon over the Philippines prior to making landfall over the Babuyan Islands. Together with the southwest monsoon, Doksuri showered most of the northern and central Luzon island with heavy rains, triggering floods in various regions of the country. Doksuri steadily weakened after interacting with land, but by late July 27, Doksuri underwent another round of rapid intensification in the South China Sea. Doksuri moved towards Fujian, China, before rapidly weakening overland, and Doksuri dissipated early on the next day.

Doksuri left behind a trail of severe destruction in its wake. The typhoon killed 137 and left 289 people injured, 27 of which were on board the MB Aya Express when the pump boat capsized. Floods were reported in 9 out of the Philippines' 17 regions, affecting over 2 million people and requiring over 300,000 to evacuate. The typhoon's close proximity and large influence to Taiwan caused around 150,000 people to lose power. The storm affected over 724,600 people and 262.3 ha (648 acres) of farmland in China's southeastern province of Fujian; 44 houses were damaged, with 178 houses completely destroyed.

In Fujian, the rainfall set records for 24-hour totals, including an accumulation of more than 648 mm (25.5 in). Torrential rains impacted many areas, with accumulations in Xiamen, Quanzhou and Putian reaching 50 mm (2.0 in). The remnants of the storm produced heavy rainfall in Beijing. The remnants dropped up to 744.8 mm (29.32 in) of rainfall in Wangjiayuan Reservoir in Changping District with Doksuri setting maximum rainfall records since recordkeeping began during the Qing dynasty in 1883, part of a trend which the heaviest rainfall events in Northern China occurred with typhoons. Overall, Doksuri caused US$28.5 billion worth of damages across the four countries affected by the typhoon. Following the extensive damage it caused in the Philippines and China, both names were retired after the season. They were replaced with Emil and Bori for future seasons.

== Meteorological history ==
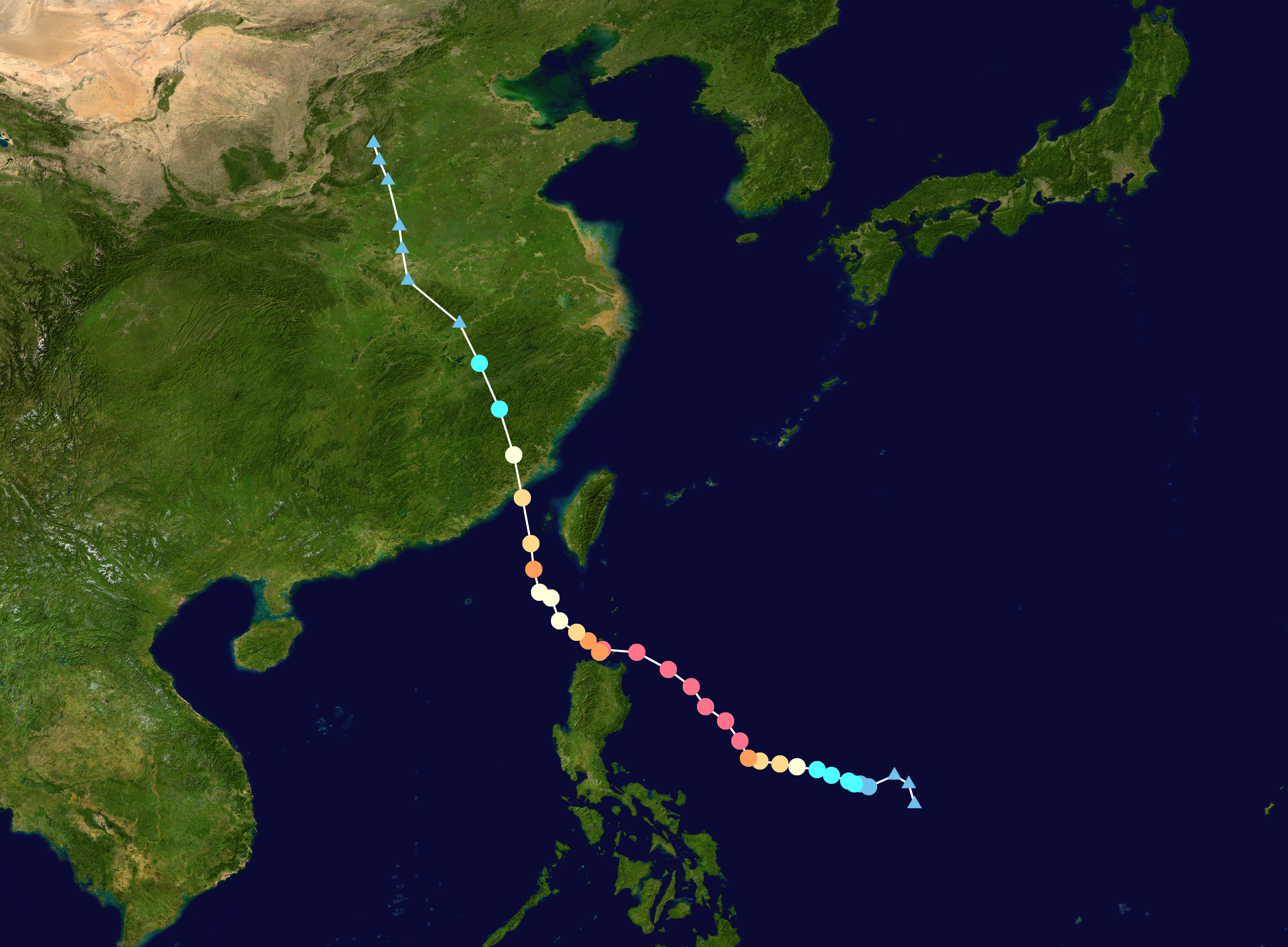
Map plotting the storm's track and intensity, according to the Saffir–Simpson scale Map key Saffir–Simpson scale Tropical depression (≤38 mph, ≤62 km/h) Tropical storm (39–73 mph, 63–118 km/h) Category 1 (74–95 mph, 119–153 km/h) Category 2 (96–110 mph, 154–177 km/h) Category 3 (111–129 mph, 178–208 km/h) Category 4 (130–156 mph, 209–251 km/h) Category 5 (≥157 mph, ≥252 km/h) Unknown Storm type Tropical cyclone Subtropical cyclone Extratropical cyclone, remnant low, tropical disturbance, or monsoon depression

On July 19, the Japan Meteorological Agency (JMA) began tracking a low pressure area in the Philippine Sea, east of Mindanao. The agency noted its formation into a tropical depression by July 20; the Joint Typhoon Warning Center (JTWC) released a Tropical Cyclone Formation Alert later that day. The system maintained its intensity over the following day as it tracked further northwestward. On July 21, the system intensified into a tropical storm and was immediately named Doksuri; the Philippine meteorological agency PAGASA also noted the storm's formation and locally named it Egay. It was then designated by JTWC as the newly formed tropical depression 05W. Driven by a deep-layer subtropical ridge to its north, the storm slightly intensified as it tracked northwestward across the following day.

At 09:00 UTC on July 23, Doksuri began to rapidly intensify as it reached typhoon status over the Philippine Sea. Its rapid intensification is attributed to a lack of vertical wind shear affecting the cyclone whilst moving over very warm (29–30 °C, 84–86 °F) ocean waters. Satellite imagery showed the development of an eye-like feature, which was fully defined by 03:00 UTC on July 24. Over 24 hours, its maximum sustained wind speeds grew by 30 knots (56 km/h; 35 mph) and eventually reached a peak of 100 knots (190 km/h; 120 mph). At 21:00 UTC, the JTWC upgraded the system into a 'super typhoon'—its highest storm category—after Doksuri attained 1-minute sustained winds of 130 knots (240 km/h; 150 mph).

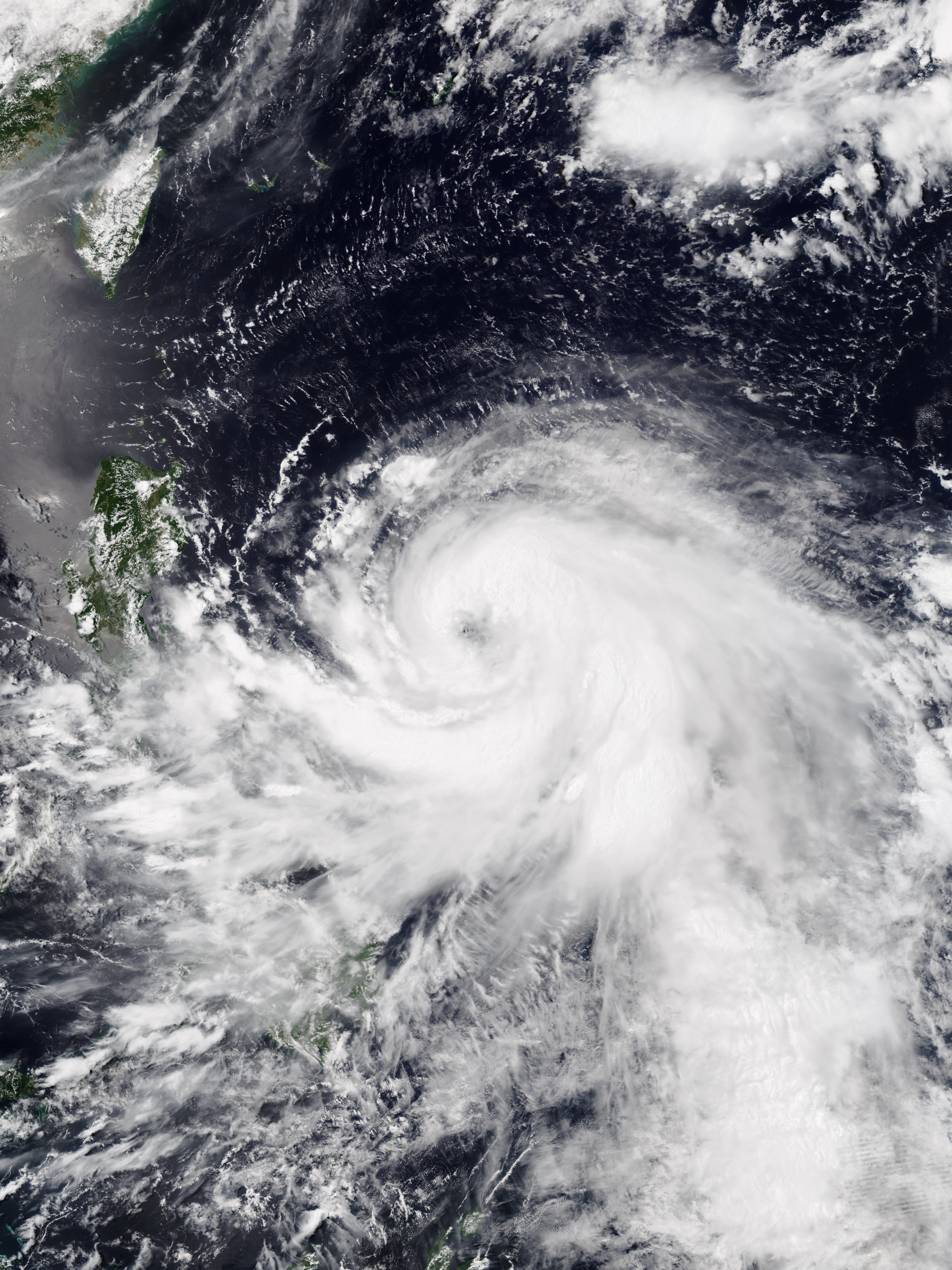
Typhoon Doksuri quickly gaining strength on July 23

At 08:00 PHT (00:00 UTC) on July 25, PAGASA declared Doksuri a 'super typhoon', making it the second PAGASA super typhoon of the season; the JTWC later downgraded the system from its super typhoon category by 09:00 UTC. Doksuri significantly slowed down as it approached the extreme northern Philippines, with a slight wobble in its movement. Though atmospheric conditions made further development favorable, interaction with land and some dry air around the system suppressed development. Nevertheless, it held its peak intensity of 100 knots for over 12 hours. At around 12:00 UTC, the storm was now just off the coast northwest of Cagayan, continuing its west-northwestward track. With its eye almost complete surrounded by dry air, Doksuri began to undergo an eyewall replacement cycle at 15:00 UTC. PAGASA downgraded the storm into a typhoon prior to making landfall at Fuga Island in Aparri, Cagayan, around 03:10 PHT (19:10 UTC). It completed its eyewall replacement cycle around 21:00 UTC, though it still maintained its intensity. Now moving westwards through the Luzon Strait, Doksuri made a second landfall over Dalupiri Island at 11:00 PHT (03:00 UTC) on July 26. The storm significantly slowed down following landfall, remaining quasi-stationary over the Babuyan Islands.

Prolonged interaction with the rugged terrain of northern Luzon began weakening the system, which slowly began moving westwards by 09:00 UTC. Doksuri left the Philippine Area of Responsibility at around 10:00 PHT (02:00 UTC) on July 27. Doksuri underwent another round of rapid intensification in the South China Sea southwest of Taiwan, forming a pinhole eye as it did so, the JTWC assessed the storm to have strengthened into 195 km/h (120 mph) of winds. Doksuri moved northwestward and subsequently made its third landfall in Jinjiang, Fujian, with two-minute sustained winds of 180 km/h (50 m/s) on July 28. As it moved further inland, Doksuri rapidly weakened. Shortly after the landfall, the JTWC discontinued warnings on the system. Doksuri tracked northwards until it was last noted on July 29, marking its dissipation.

== Preparations ==
=== Philippines ===
==== Highest Tropical Cyclone Wind Signal ====
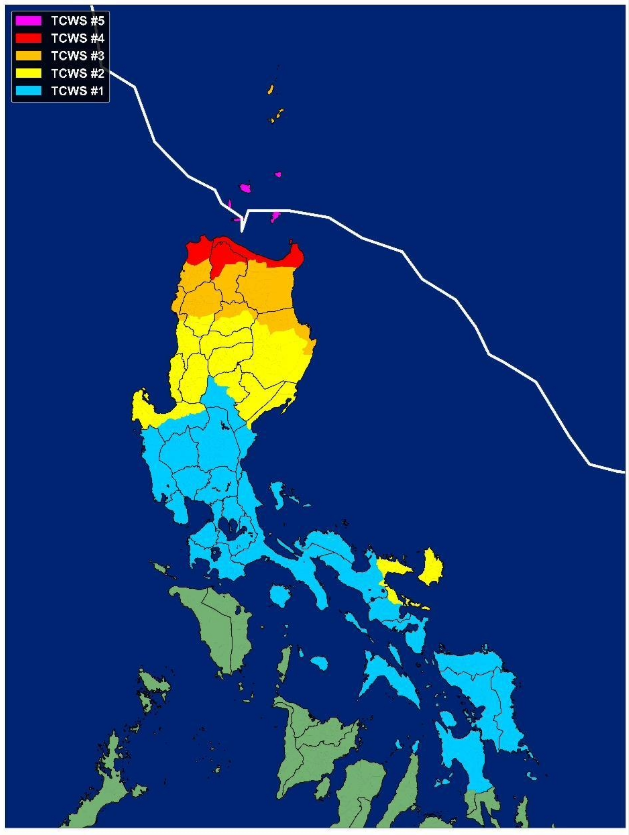
Highest Tropical Cyclone Wind Signal issued by PAGASA for Doksuri (Egay) in each province. The white line represents the best track.

PAGASA began tracking the low pressure area that would eventually develop into Doksuri as early as July 17, 2023. The agency's first bulletin on the storm was released on July 21. Doksuri was already forecasted to reach super typhoon intensity as early as the first forecast. Initial forecasts indicated that the storm would narrowly miss the Luzon mainland, instead tracking directly towards Taiwan or the Bashi Channel, though uncertainty of the forecast track was made clear in the agency's bulletins. The Philippine Institute of Volcanology and Seismology issued lahar advisories for the Mayon Volcano (at the time under Alert Level 3) as the trough of Doksuri brought rain over Caraga and Eastern Visayas. On July 23, sea travel in areas of Bicol were suspended. The Department of the Interior and Local Government asked local governments to prepare for the disaster, and requested that mayors and governors stay within their constituencies.

As the storm began its phase of rapid intensification and began tracking closer to the Philippines, PAGASA began raising Tropical Cyclone Wind Signals (TCWS) for parts of northern Luzon. Expecting rough weather and a transport strike protesting the 2023 State of the Nation Address, classes in public schools and work in government offices were suspended in Metro Manila for July 24. The municipality of Taytay in Rizal, the city of Bacoor in Cavite, and the province of Pampanga also suspended classes and government work, following the same rationale. Classes and government work in Catanduanes, Iloilo, Laguna, and Cagayan were suspended due to heavy rains and floods. Workers in the private sector were excused from penalties for skipping work due to the weather; this assurance was provided by a labor advisory circulated by the Department of Labor and Employment in 2022. Two domestic flights were cancelled for the day, and sea trips between Cebu and Negros Occidental were suspended. In preparation for the storm, the Department of Social Welfare and Development (DSWD) prepared 51,039 food packs in DSWD- and local government unit-managed warehouses in the Cordillera Administrative Region. Telecommunications company Globe Telecom prepared emergency supplies and personnel in areas where the storm is expected to hit.

After the storm reached super typhoon status on the morning of July 25, the agency raised Signal No. 4 in extreme northern parts of Luzon. Later on the same day, the agency further raised the signal into Signal No. 5 in the eastern portion of Babuyan Islands, the first time since Typhoon Noru of the previous year and the fourth tropical cyclone to raise the highest signal by PAGASA. Now under the risk of violent, life-threatening winds, evacuations began in the island group's coastal communities — areas which stood directly on the typhoon's forecasted path. Forced evacuations began in Cagayan as heavy winds of up to 184 km/h (114 mph) battered the region. Evacuations also began in Palawan after heavy rains began as rivers quickly swelled. Around 23 domestic flights were cancelled for July 25, another eight for the following days. The Laoag International Airport, situated in northern Luzon, cancelled all its flights for July 25 and 26. Various sea ports in Calabarzon, Mimaropa, and the Bicol Region suspended operations due to strong waves. The earlier transport strike—supposed to last three days—was suspended. Local governments across Luzon and parts of Visayas also suspended classes for the 25th and 26th. Large waves forced Boracay to suspend water sports activities. By July 27, most TCWS signals were lowered by the PAGASA as the storm left the Philippine Area of Responsibility. Signals remained up, however, for areas in northern Luzon which were still within the extent of Doksuri's gale-force winds.

=== Taiwan ===
As the typhoon passed south of Taiwan, sea and land warnings were raised in the southern counties of Pingtung and Taitung and in the cities of Tainan and Kaohsiung. Annual military drills in the country were cancelled in preparation. Taiwan also issued a land warning for Doksuri at 06:00 UTC. More than 5,700 people were evacuated in southern and eastern Taiwan as Doksuri was expected to bring up to 1 metre (3.3 feet) of rainfall. All domestic flights, over 100 international flights, and many ferry lines were cancelled. Railway services were suspended starting July 26. As a precaution, some highways in Taiwan were briefly closed. The Taiwanese islands of Penghu and Kinmen were issued a "hurricane-force winds" alert advising people to prepare for gusts up to 287 km/h (178 mph).

=== China ===
The China Meteorological Administration (CMA) issued a red alert—the highest level of its four-tier color-coded weather warning system—ahead of the impending arrival of Doksuri on its southern coast. Authorities in China have issued an advisory stopping all indoor and outdoor activities in the affected regions as well as construction activity along the coast. Train services on routes along the coast along with other high-risk zones in Guangdong were stopped or altered until July 30. China has instructed people to remain indoors and ordered businesses and schools to close their doors. At least 416,000 people were evacuated in Fujian. All expressways in Xiamen, Zhangzhou, and Quanzhou were temporarily shut down. According to State Flood Control and Drought Relief headquarters in China, four teams were dispatched to the provinces of Zhejiang, Fujian, Guangdong, and Jiangxi to assist with local flood and typhoon prevention efforts. At least 4,000 rescuers and five helicopters were deployed in the four provinces.

== Impact ==
Impact by country or region
Country/Region	Deaths	Missing	Injuries	Damage (USD)	Refs.
Philippines	56 (Note: Deaths from the MB Aya Express are not counted by the NDRRMC, as they are "indirect deaths". They are still included in the final tally for this article.)	11	140	$257 million	
Taiwan	1	None	68	$12.1 million	
Mainland China	80	35	39	$28.3 billion	
Vietnam	None	None	17	$44.2 million	
Totals	137	46	264	$28.5 billion	

=== Philippines ===
Doksuri carried expansive rain bands as it approached the Philippines, exacerbating the existing southwest monsoon and causing widespread rains and floods over most of the country. As early as July 23, rain from the storm triggered floods in Pampanga. Nine out of the Philippines' seventeen regions were hit with heavy rain and floods. Doksuri was responsible for 54 deaths, 25 of which remain unconfirmed.

Over ₱175 million (US$3.21 million) in government funds were put on standby. The Department of Agriculture also prepared a ₱1 billion (US$18.3 million) response fund for agricultural areas hit by the storm. The Armed Forces of the Philippines' deployed troops and equipment of their disaster response brigades. Teams from the Bureau of Fire Protection and Philippine Coast Guard also participated in rescue operations. Disaster risk reduction management offices in Pangasinan and La Union went on red alert on July 25, entailing the deployment of evacuation facilities and rescue teams. The Government Service Insurance System prepared emergency loan programs for calamity-hit individuals.

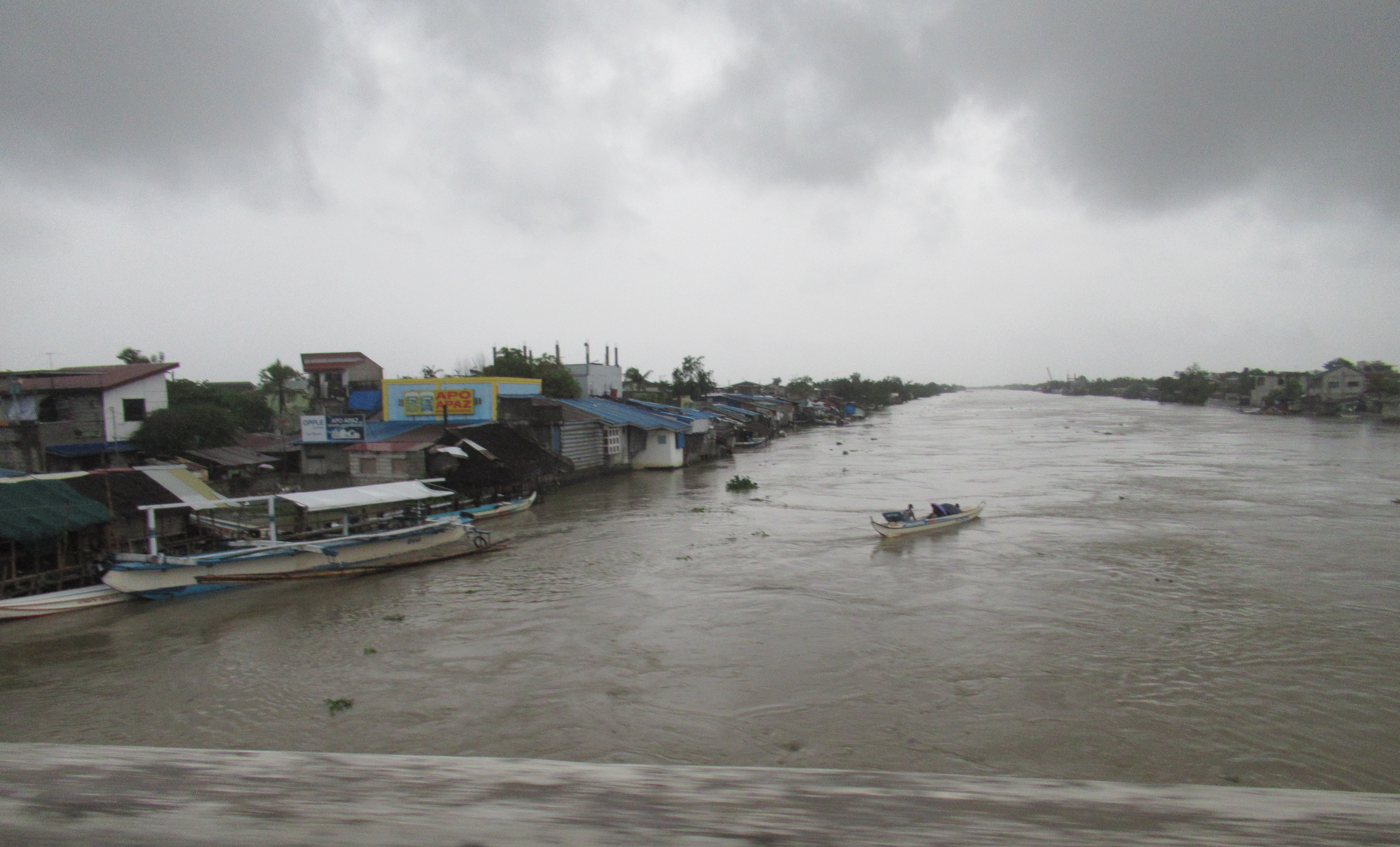
Floodwaters in Bulacan after Typhoon Doksuri

Two organizations from the private sector began facilitating the sale of produce which were harvested in advance to evade damage from the typhoon's strong winds. A collection of lawmakers from the Tingog Party List provided ₱117 million (US$2.14 million) to stricken victims: ₱22 million (US$403,000) sourced from personal funds, and the remaining ₱95 million (US$1.74 million) pulled from the Department of Social Welfare and Development's crisis program.

As of the morning of 3 August 2023, the NDRRMC reports 2,930,200 people have been affected by the storm, spread across 13 regions across the Philippines. At least 312,995 of those were displaced and required evacuation. Doksuri is attributed with 2 confirmed and 25 unconfirmed deaths, and another 127 confirmed and 13 unconfirmed injuries. 13 people remain missing. Officials in Baguio and Benguet report 5 deaths and seven injuries from landslides. In Ramon, Isabela, one person was killed by a falling coconut tree during strong winds. One person was reported missing after a landslide that occurred in Benguet. Two tourists nearly drowned in Boracay from water sports activities amid high waves. The entire provinces of Ilocos Norte, Ilocos Sur, Cagayan, Pampanga, Bataan, Cavite, Abra, Apayao, and Mountain Province, including 18 additional cities/municipalities, have declared a state of calamity.

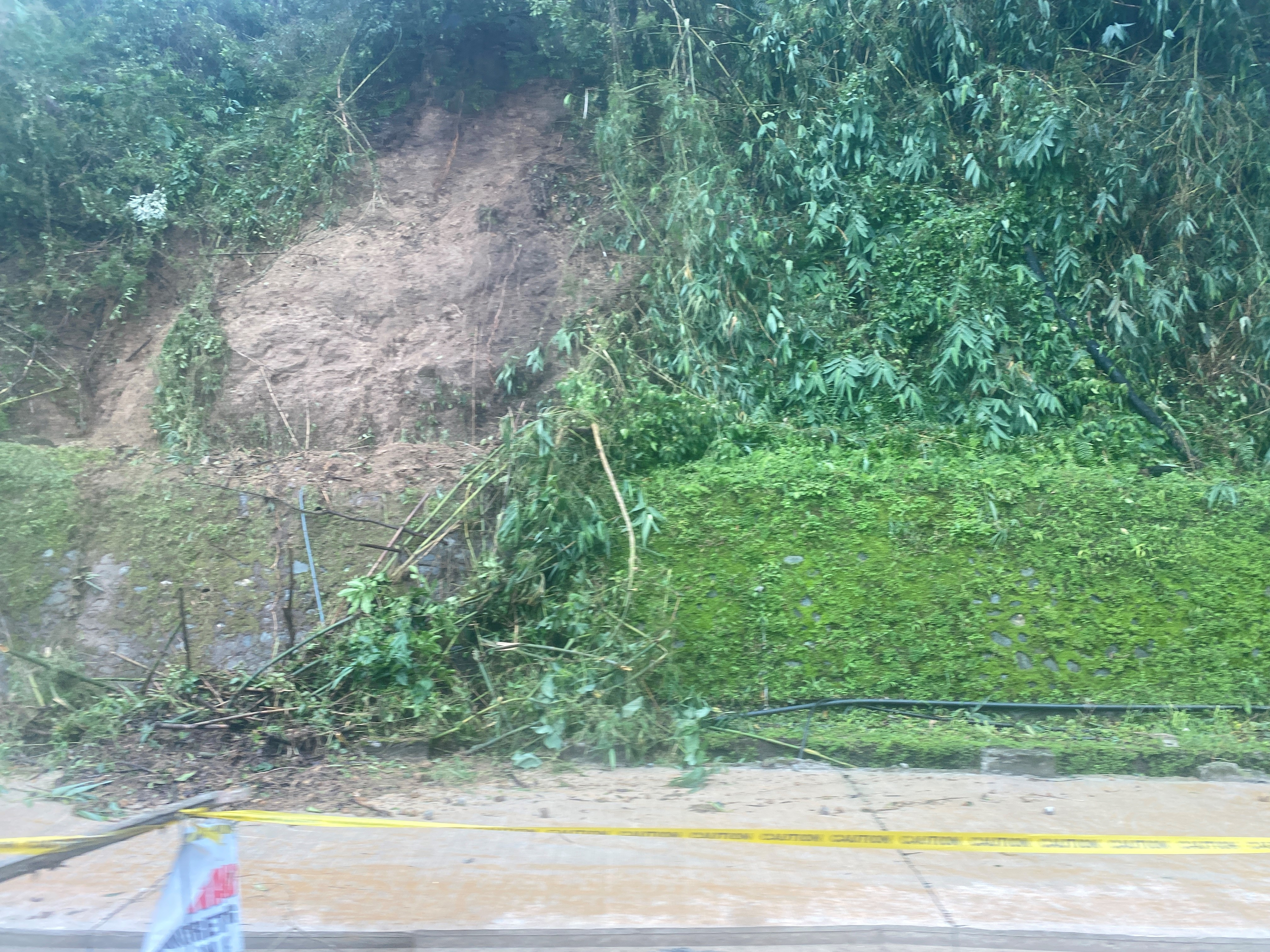
An eroded area with a fallen tree branch in the Cordillera Administrative Region after Doksuri.

In the coastal town of Santa Ana, Cagayan, over 433 families (1,426 residents) were brought to evacuation centers. Floods in Bacolod forced the evacuation of over 3,300 residents near waterways which quickly became inundated. A cargo ship in Cabadbaran, Agusan del Norte, ran aground; its crew of 24 was later rescued by the Philippine Coast Guard. Two residents in Baguio were rescued from a landslide; another three in Solano, Nueva Vizcaya were rescued after a tree fell on a residential building.

Infrastructural damage were at ₱8.65 billion (US$148 million), agricultural damage were pegged at ₱6.37 billion (US$109 million). 86,741 houses were damaged and suffered a loss of ₱344,000 (US$5,874.92), while the damage to other assets were estimated at ₱9.98 million (US$170,393). As such, the total damage, including those caused by Typhoon Khanun a few days later, were amounted to be ₱15 billion (US$257 million). Over ₱765 million (US$13.1 million) worth of assistance was provided, most of which sourced from the DSWD and local government units. Power outages were reported in 306 areas, while six areas also reported water outages. An additional 15 cities/municipalities reported telecommunication outages. Around 90% of Baguio suffered power outages throughout the night of July 26.

In official reports, 85 domestic flights were cancelled, while 145 seaports cancelled trips. As much as 8,949 passengers were stranded in ports across 6 regions. Official reports tallied up to 448 class suspensions in various areas, while around 355 suspended work. Classes and transport were also suspended for July 27 in some areas. Laoag International Airport, Vigan Airport, and Tuguegarao Airport suffered minimal damage; 25 airports in total were affected. Across the country, 396 roads and 33 bridges were rendered impassable.

==== Widespread flooding ====
Costliest known Pacific typhoons (adjusted for inflation)
Rank	Typhoon	Season	Damage (2025 USD)
1	4 Doksuri	2023	$30.1 billion
2	4 Mireille	1991	$23.6 billion
3	5 Hagibis	2019	$21.8 billion
4	5 Saomai	2000	$17.3 billion
5	5 Jebi	2018	$16.7 billion
6	4 Songda	2004	$15.9 billion
7	5 Yagi	2024	$15.1 billion
8	2 Fitow	2013	$14.4 billion
9	4 Faxai	2019	$12.6 billion
10	4 Tokage	2004	$12.1 billion

Doksuri and Typhoon Khanun exacerbated the southwest monsoon which had already been causing rains in much of the country. In the aftermath of the typhoon, flooding was reported in 9 of the 13 affected regions. The first of these floods occurred in Pampanga, as early as July 23 – two days before the typhoon's first landfall. A day prior to landfall, PAGASA had warned of highly-likely floods as a result of heavy rainfall, particularly in elevated and mountainous areas. The NDRRMC reported floods in 957 areas across the country. Much of these floods occurred in the Ilocos and Central Luzon regions.

Over the course of July 27 to August 1, rainfall in Baguio, Zambales, and Bataan reached over 500 millimeters (20 in) of rain per square meter, with rainfall in Ilocos Sur treading close to the same amount. Laoag alone received over 620 millimeters (24 in) of rainfall in just 48 hours, even more than the town's average rainfall for the entire month of July. One death has been attributed to flash floods caused by the typhoon. By August 3, floods had only receded in a third (347 areas) of all flooded areas.

On July 26, in response to increasing water levels, the Ambuklao Dam and Binga Dam began discharging water at rates of 60 (2,100) and 65 cubic metres (2,300 cu ft), respectively; discharge rates were later increased on July 27. Meanwhile, the La Mesa Dam neared its spilling level of 80.15 meters (263.0 ft), prompting the release of flood warnings. As rains continued throughout the day, the Ipo Dam reached its spilling level of 101 meters (331 ft), while the lower Bustos Dam also reached its spilling level of 17.22 meters (56.5 ft). Now at critical levels and with persisting heavy rains, the two dams were forced to open at rates of 49.83 (1,760) and 737 cubic meters (26,000 cu ft) of water per second. An issue with one of Bustos Dam's gates and the allegedly unannounced release of water triggered extensive floods in much of Bulacan.

The Marikina River, which runs through Metro Manila, was raised to second alarm after reaching a water level of 16.1 meters (53 ft), prompting preemptive evacuations. Major roads in Metro Manila became flooded after heavy rains from Doksuri's far-reaching rainbands. Swelling of the Pampanga River from the persistent rain triggered floods that reached the North Luzon Expressway, causing standstill traffic along the national highway. Over 1 kilometer (0.62 mi) of road was covered by floods in a portion of the expressway that runs through San Simon, Pampanga. Some of the smaller vehicles passing through the expressway broke down while attempting to cross deep floods. An alternative route passing through the MacArthur Highway was opened by expressway officials, but soon also hit heavy traffic due to the volume of passing vehicles.

Following the floods in Bulacan, the National Irrigation Administration was called to a Senate Blue Ribbon Committee hearing to address the allegations. Senators later filed resolutions calling for a review of the Department of Public Works and Highways' flood control and mitigation programs.

==== MB Aya Express ====
A pump boat called the MB Aya Express capsized near Talim Island in Binangonan, Rizal, killing at least 27 people. The incident happened around 1 pm. PHT on July 27. As the pump boat was pounded by strong winds, passengers panicked to the port (left) side causing the boat to capsize barely 40 meters (130 ft) from shore. The next day, the Maritime Industry Authority (MARINA) suspended the safety permit of the vessel and issued a show cause order to its shipowner.

The casualties would not be added to the National Disaster Risk Reduction and Management Council's official toll. The Office of Civil Defense cited that these were indirectly caused by the typhoon that was already outside the Philippine Area of Responsibility as the accident happened, although it enhanced the southwest monsoon which caused further heavy rainfall and strong winds.

=== Taiwan ===
At least 278,000 homes in Taiwan lost power as a result of the storm, and hundreds of trees were also felled in Kaohsiung. Doksuri brought heavy rain in mountainous southern and eastern regions, with accumulated rainfall totaled 0.7 m (28 in). A woman drowned on July 26 in the Mugua River near Wenlan Village in Xiulin, Hualien, after getting trapped by rising water levels. Agricultural damage amounted to be NT$380 million (US$12.1 million).

=== Mainland China ===
==== Fujian ====
Wettest tropical cyclones and their remnants in Mainland China Highest-known totals
Precipitation			Storm	Location	Ref.
Rank	mm	in	Storm	Location	Ref.
1	1629.0	64.13	Nina 1975	Banqiao Dam	
2	951.0	37.4	In-fa 2021	Yuyao	
3	831.1	32.72	Fitow 2001	Changjiang County	
4	806.0	31.73	Soudelor 2015	Wenzhou	
5	744.8	29.32	Doksuri 2023	Wangjiayuan Reservoir	
6	662.0	26.01	Chanthu 2021	Dinghai District, Zhoushan	
7	600.0	24.00	Haikui 2012	Anhui Province	
8	555.0	21.85	Chanchu 2006	Zhangpu County	

Typhoon Doksuri was the strongest typhoon to impact southeastern Fujian since Typhoon Meranti in 2016, and the most powerful typhoon to strike Fujian since records began in 1950. Doksuri made landfall in Jinjiang, Fujian on the morning of July 28. It affected over 724,600 people and 262.3 ha (648 acres) of farmland in Fujian. Among them, 8.36 ha (20.7 acres) suffered complete crop failure, according to the provincial flood control and drought relief headquarters. More than 416,000 people in Fujian were evacuated to safe places, and another 30,000-plus personnel, including those working at offshore farms, went ashore for shelter. Over 800 ships of various types returned to ports. At least five Fujian cities broke 24-hour rainfall records, including Baisha in Putian, which received 648 mm (25.5 in) in a single day.

Fuzhou saw a record daily precipitation total of 256.6 mm (10.10 in). In addition, 178 houses were totally destroyed, while another 44 houses were damaged. A total of 463 tourist sites, 11,624 construction sites, and 202 port terminals were closed, while all 89 passenger ferry routes were suspended. Direct economic losses amounted to ¥14.76 billion (US$2.06 billion). Torrential rains impacted many areas, with accumulations in Xiamen, Quanzhou and Putian reaching 50 mm (2.0 in). In Quanzhou, power outages impacted more than 500,000 houses and resulted in 39 people reporting minor injuries.

==== Beijing, Jilin and Hebei ====
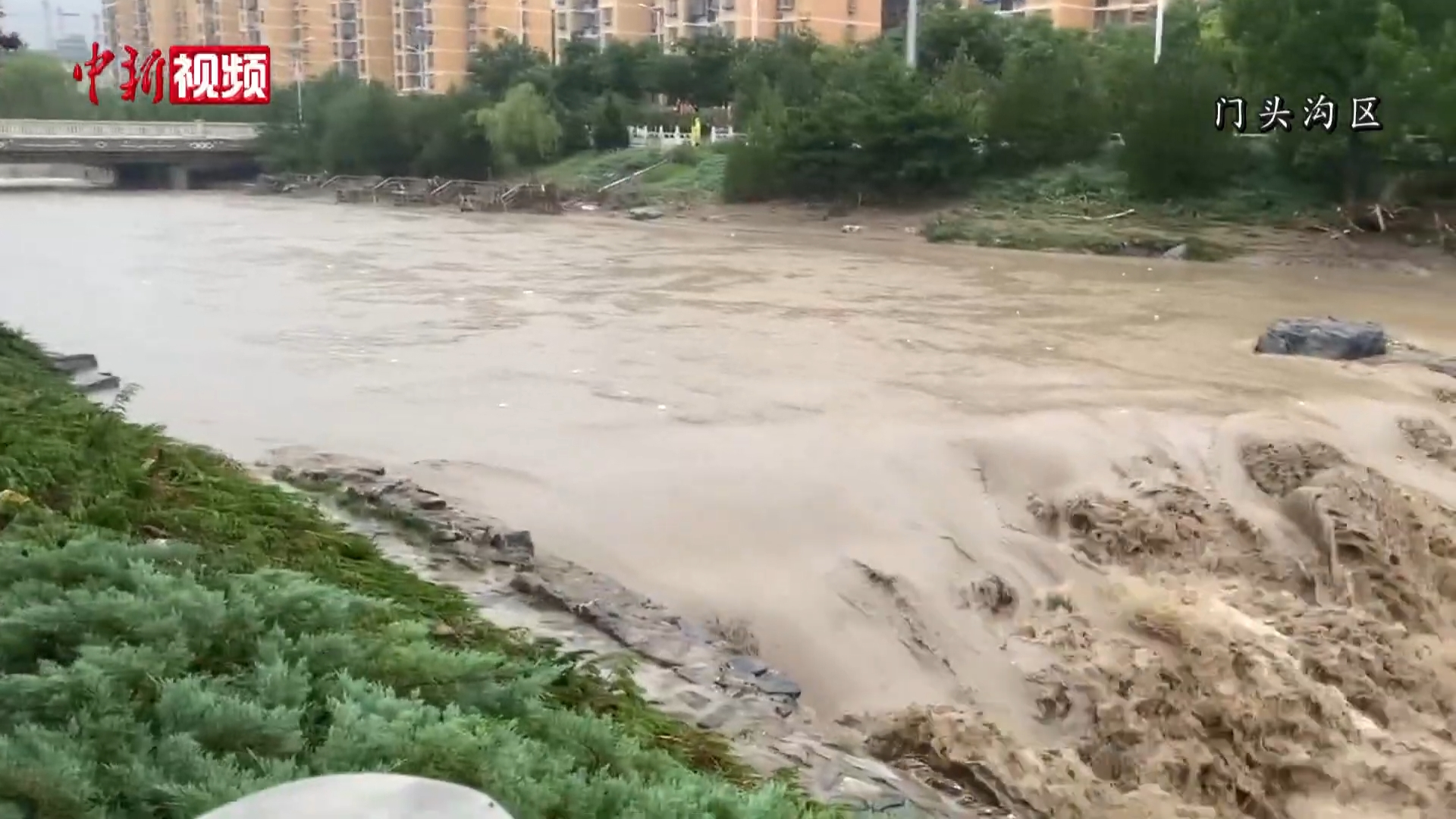
Widespread flooding occurred throughout Mentougou District in Beijing

As a remnant system, Doksuri brought brief heavy rainfall accumulations in Beijing, averaging 276.5 mm (10.89 in); the largest rainfall occurred in Xincun in Shidu, Fangshan District, 500.4 mm (19.70 in); The maximum hourly rain intensity occurred in Qianling Mountain, Fengtai District, at 111.8 mm (4.40 in); as the remnant dropped up to 744.8 mm (29.32 in) of rainfall in Wangjiayuan Reservoir in Changping District with Doksuri setting maximum rainfall records since recordkeeping began during the Qing dynasty in 1883. The National Meteorological Center of CMA issued a red alert—the highest level warning for heavy rainfall—this was only the second time a red rainfall warning had been issued—since the warning system was formally implemented in 2010. A total of 59,000 houses were destroyed and 147,000 others were severely damaged by flooding in the region. According to state broadcaster China Central Television, around 31,000 individuals fled their homes in high-risk regions in Beijing. Another 20,000 individuals were relocated from the adjacent province of Hebei. Over 300 flights from Beijing Daxing International Airport have been canceled. Roughly 50,000 individuals were evacuated from the capital. Power outages were reported in 60,000 areas.

At least 80 individuals have been killed; 33 in Beijing, 29 in Hebei, 14 in Jilin and four in Liaoning. As of August 11, at least 35 others are still missing, including 18 in Beijing, 16 in Hebei, and another in Jilin. In early August flood control systems were used to redirect 1.8 billion cubic meters of water from Beijing and Tianjin to low-lying areas of Hebei. More than 850,000 residents were told to evacuate, including 134,000 in Zhuozhou, 73,000 in Bazhou and 113,000 in Gaobeidian. Overall, Doksuri and its remnants caused ¥202.3 billion (US$28.3 billion) in property damages, becoming the costliest typhoon in Chinese history.

=== Vietnam ===
Although Doksuri remained far away, it caused heavy rainfalls and strong winds across Southern Vietnam. In Kiên Giang province, strong winds blew up 125 house roofs and collapsed 72 others; 13 people were injured. Damage in the province were amounted to 2.6 billion đồng (US$110,000). In Cà Mau province, strong winds torn off 347 house roofs, in which 70 were collapsed. Many trees and power lines were downed. Four people were injured, and the damage in the province reached 9.5 billion đồng (US$401,000). Doksuri brought heavy rains and triggered flooding and landslides Đắk Nông province. Two major flooding in late July and early August resulted in a loss of 1.046 trillion đồng (US$44.2 million).

== Aftermath ==
=== China ===
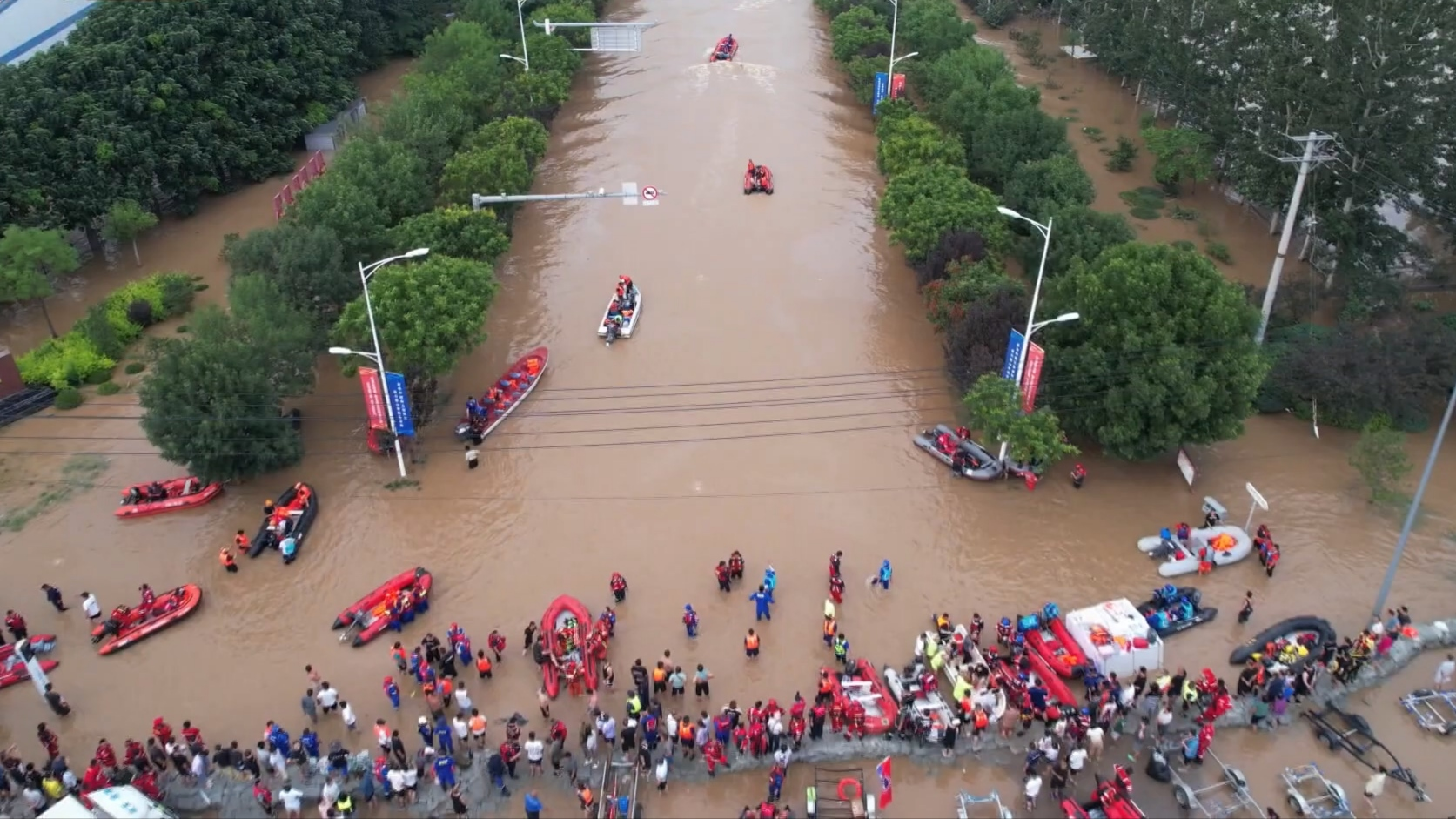
Rescue workers evacuate flood-affected people in Zhuozhou.

Xi Jinping, General Secretary of the Chinese Communist Party and President of China, urged local officials to make every effort to find individuals who are missing or trapped. Chinese Premier Li Qiang called for all-out efforts during rescue and relief operations and stressed that ensuring people's lives and safety is a top priority. While inspecting relief efforts local Communist Party secretary Ni Yuefeng commented that Hebei should "serve as the capital's moat", prompting criticism online.

Chinese officials earmarked ¥90 million (US$12.6 million) from the central natural disaster-relief funds for the provinces of Fujian, Guangdong, and Zhejiang on July 28. The Ministry of Finance also allocated ¥842 million (US$117 million) to 12 provinces including Hebei for agricultural disaster prevention and mitigation and water conservancy disaster relief on July 31.

The National Development and Reform Commission stated that it would immediately set aside ¥100 million (US$13.9 million) from the national budget for post-disaster emergency restoration and reconstruction of infrastructure and public service facilities in areas severely affected in Beijing and Hebei.

The Ministry of Agriculture and Rural Affairs announced US$60 million in flood relief money to help the region's farm sector. JD.com announced the donation of ¥30 million (US$4.18 million) in materials to aid flood prevention in Beijing, Tianjin and Hebei. Apple CEO Tim Cook said that Apple would donate to flood relief efforts in Beijing and the surrounding Hebei province. Xiaomi also provided an amount of ¥25 million (US$3.48 million) towards disaster relief efforts in Beijing and Hebei. Condolences to China were expressed by most countries, including the United States, Taiwan, and Ukraine.

== Retirement ==
On January 19, 2024, PAGASA retired the name Egay from the rotating naming lists due to extreme damage and loss of life it caused, particularly in Northern Luzon and it will never be used again as a typhoon name within the Philippine Area of Responsibility (PAR); it was officially replaced by Emil for the 2027 season.

After the season, the Typhoon Committee announced that the name Doksuri, along with two others, would be removed from the naming lists due to the damages it brought in the Philippines and China. In the spring of 2025, the name was officially replaced by Bori for future seasons, which means "barley" in Korean.

== See also ==
- Tropical cyclones in 2023
- Weather of 2023
- List of Philippine typhoons (2000–present)

== Notes ==
Preceded by Hagibis	Costliest Pacific typhoons on record (nominal); 2023	Succeeded by None
