= Gaobeidian (disambiguation) =

Gaobeidian (高碑店) may refer to the following locations in China:

- Gaobeidian, a county-level city under the administration of Baoding, in Hebei Province.
- Gaobeidian, Beijing, in Chaoyang District, Beijing.

== See also ==
- Gaobeidian station, a metro station on Batong Line of the Beijing Subway, in Chaoyang District, Beijing.
- Gaobeidian railway station, a railway station in Gaobeidian, Baoding, Hebei Province.
