= Zhuozhou railway station =

Railway station in Baoding, Hebei, China

Zhuozhou 涿州
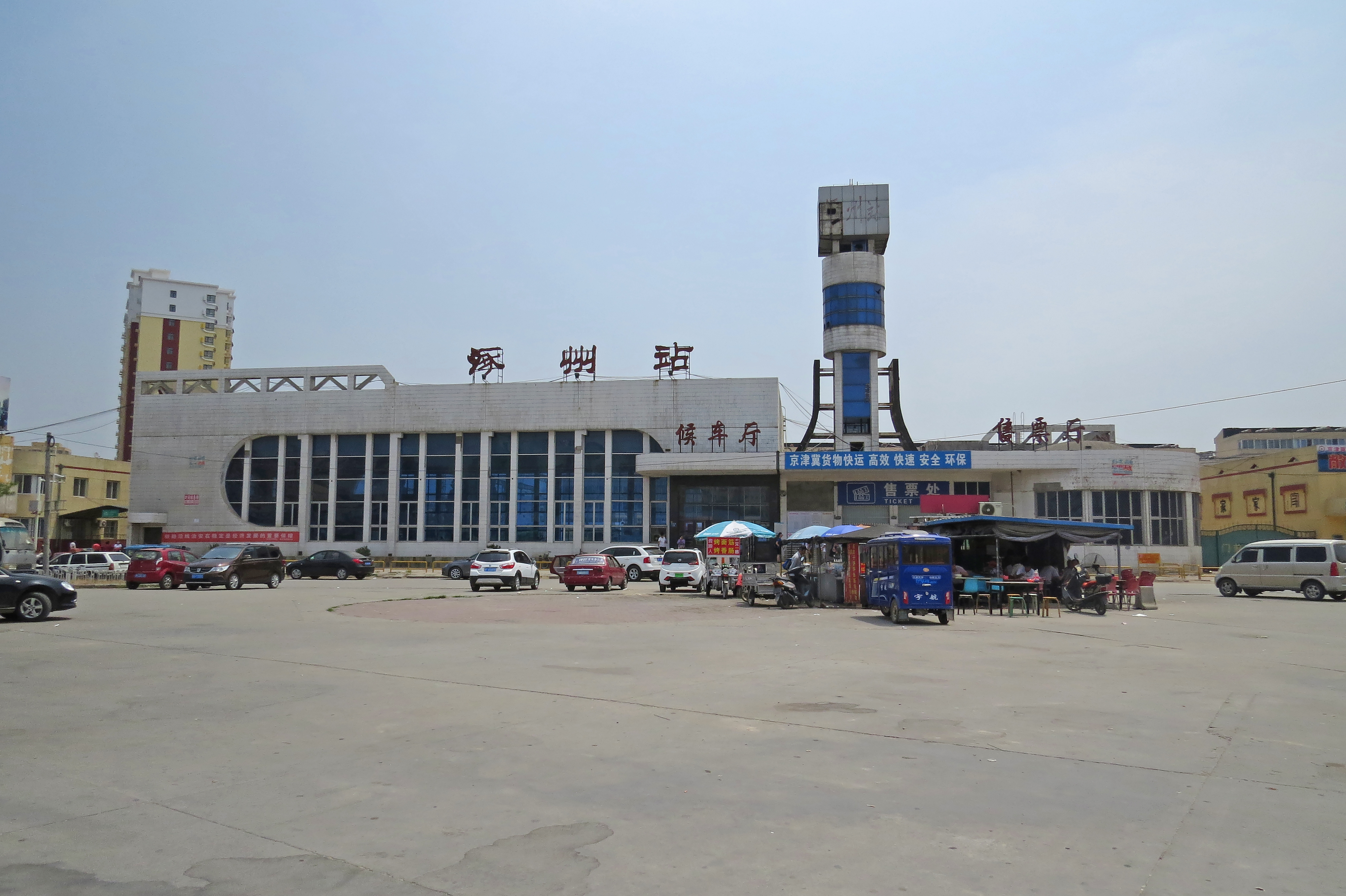

General information
- Location: 73 Yingbin Road; Zhuozhou, Baoding, Hebei; China
- Coordinates: 39°28′48″N 115°58′41″E
- Operator: CR Beijing
- Line: Beijing–Guangzhou railway
- Distance: Beijing–Guangzhou railway: 62 kilometres (39 mi) from Beijing West; 2,234 kilometres (1,388 mi) from Guangzhou
- Platforms: 3 (1 side platform and 1 island platform)
- Tracks: 5

Other information
- Station code: 20276 (TMIS code); ZXP (telegraph code); ZZH (Pinyin code)
- Classification: Class 3 station (三等站)

History
- Opened: 1899
- Former names: Zhuoxian (Chinese: 涿县)

Services
Preceding station	China Railway	Following station
Liangxiang towards Beijing West	Beijing–Guangzhou railway	Gaobeidian towards Guangzhou
Location
- Location within Hebei Location within China

Zhuozhou railway station (Chinese: 涿州站) is a station on Beijing–Guangzhou railway in Zhuozhou, Baoding, Hebei.

== History ==
The station was opened in 1899.

== See also ==
- Zhuozhou East railway station
