= Fangguan =

Fangguan 方官镇
- Town
- Fangguan Zhen
- Location in Hebei Location in China
- Coordinates: 39°19′28.8″N 115°59′29.7″E
- Country: People's Republic of China
- Province: Hebei
- Prefecture-level city: Baoding
- County-level city: Gaobeidian

Area
  - Total: 63.51 km^{2} (24.52 sq mi)

Population (2010)
  - Total: 46,090
  - Density: 725.7/km^{2} (1,880/sq mi)
- Time zone: UTC+8 (China Standard)
- Local dialing code: 312

Fangguan (Chinese: 方官镇; pinyin: Fāngguān Zhèn) is a town in Gaobeidian, Baoding, Hebei, China. According to the 2010 census, Fangguan had a population of 46,090, including 23,313 males and 22,777 females. The population was distributed as follows: 6,537 people aged under 14, 35,233 people aged between 15 and 64, and 4,320 people aged over 65.

== See also ==
- List of township-level divisions of Hebei
