= Xinlizhuang =

Xinlizhuang 辛立庄镇
- Town
- Xinlizhuang Zhen
- Location in Hebei Location in China
- Coordinates: 39°17′15.9″N 116°10′14.7″E
- Country: People's Republic of China
- Province: Hebei
- Prefecture-level city: Baoding
- County-level city: Gaobeidian

Area
  - Total: 69.78 km^{2} (26.94 sq mi)

Population (2010)
  - Total: 39,474
  - Density: 565.7/km^{2} (1,465/sq mi)
- Time zone: UTC+8 (China Standard)
- Local dialing code: 312

Xinlizhuang (Chinese: 辛立庄镇; pinyin: Xīnlìzhuāng Zhèn) is a town located in Gaobeidian, Baoding, Hebei, China. According to the 2010 census, Xinlizhuang had a population of 39,474, including 19,955 males and 19,519 females. The population was distributed as follows: 6,726 people aged under 14, 28,934 people aged between 15 and 64, and 3,814 people aged over 65.

== See also ==
- List of township-level divisions of Hebei
