= Juncheng Subdistrict =

Juncheng Subdistrict 军城街道
- Subdistrict
- Juncheng Jiedao
- Location in Hebei Location in China
- Coordinates: 39°22′20.8″N 115°50′24.5″E
- Country: People's Republic of China
- Province: Hebei
- Prefecture-level city: Baoding
- County-level city: Gaobeidian

Area
  - Total: 21.39 km^{2} (8.26 sq mi)

Population (2010)
  - Total: 15,038
  - Density: 703/km^{2} (1,820/sq mi)
- Time zone: UTC+8 (China Standard)
- Local dialing code: 312

Juncheng Subdistrict (Chinese: 军城街道; pinyin: Jūnchéng Jiēdào) is an urban subdistrict in Gaobeidian, Baoding, Hebei, China. According to the 2010 census, Juncheng Subdistrict had a population of 15,038, including 8,086 males and 6,952 females. The population was distributed as follows: 2,070 people aged under 14, 11,888 people aged between 15 and 64, and 1,080 people aged over 65.

== See also ==
- List of township-level divisions of Hebei
