= Baichigan =

Baichigan 百尺竿镇
- Town
- Baichigan Zhen
- Location in Hebei Location in China
- Coordinates: 39°31′42.5″N 115°51′45.5″E
- Country: People's Republic of China
- Province: Hebei
- Prefecture-level city: Baoding
- County-level city: Zhuozhou

Area
  - Total: 56.45 km^{2} (21.80 sq mi)

Population (2010)
  - Total: 40,748
  - Density: 721.9/km^{2} (1,870/sq mi)
- Time zone: UTC+8 (China Standard)
- Area code: 312

Baichigan (Chinese: 百尺竿镇; pinyin: Bǎichǐgān Zhèn) is a town under the administration of Zhuozhou, a county-level city in Baoding, Hebei Province, China. According to the 2010 census, it had a population of 40,748. The population consisted of 20,782 males and 19,966 females. The age distribution included 5,957 individuals under the age of 14, 31,473 between 15 and 64 years old, and 3,318 aged 65 and over.

== See also ==
- List of township-level divisions of Hebei
