= Matou, Zhuozhou =

Matou 码头镇
- Town
- Matou Zhen
- Location in Hebei Location in China
- Coordinates: 39°33′07.7″N 116°06′45.8″E
- Country: People's Republic of China
- Province: Hebei
- Prefecture-level city: Baoding
- County-level city: Zhuozhou

Area
  - Total: 58.48 km^{2} (22.58 sq mi)

Population (2010)
  - Total: 34,281
  - Density: 586.2/km^{2} (1,518/sq mi)
- Time zone: UTC+8 (China Standard)
- Local dialing code: 312

Matou (Chinese: 码头镇; pinyin: Mǎtóu Zhèn) is a town of Zhuozhou, Baoding, Hebei, China. As of the 2010 census, it had a population of 34,281, with 17,331 males and 16,950 females. Age distribution included 5,109 individuals under 14 years, 26,401 aged 15–64, and 2,771 over 65.

== See also ==
- List of township-level divisions of Hebei
