= Songlindian =

Songlindian 松林店镇
- Town
- Songlindian Zhen
- Location in Hebei Location in China
- Coordinates: 39°24′45.8″N 115°56′39.6″E
- Country: People's Republic of China
- Province: Hebei
- Prefecture-level city: Baoding
- County-level city: Zhuozhou

Area
  - Total: 76.61 km^{2} (29.58 sq mi)

Population (2010)
  - Total: 54,467
  - Density: 711/km^{2} (1,840/sq mi)
- Time zone: UTC+8 (China Standard)
- Local dialing code: 312

Songlindian (Chinese: 松林店镇; pinyin: Sōnglíndiàn Zhèn) is a town of Zhuozhou, Baoding, Hebei, China. As of the 2010 census, it had a population of 54,467, with 27,073 males and 27,394 females. Age distribution included 7,651 individuals under 14 years, 41,917 aged 15–64, and 4,899 over 65.

== See also ==
- List of township-level divisions of Hebei
