= Dongxianpo =

Dongxianpo 东仙坡镇
- Town
- Dongxianpo Zhen
- Location in Hebei Location in China
- Coordinates: 39°33′42.2″N 115°59′33.4″E
- Country: People's Republic of China
- Province: Hebei
- Prefecture-level city: Baoding
- County-level city: Zhuozhou

Area
  - Total: 45.87 km^{2} (17.71 sq mi)

Population (2010)
  - Total: 31,410
  - Density: 684.8/km^{2} (1,774/sq mi)
- Time zone: UTC+8 (China Standard)
- Area code: 312

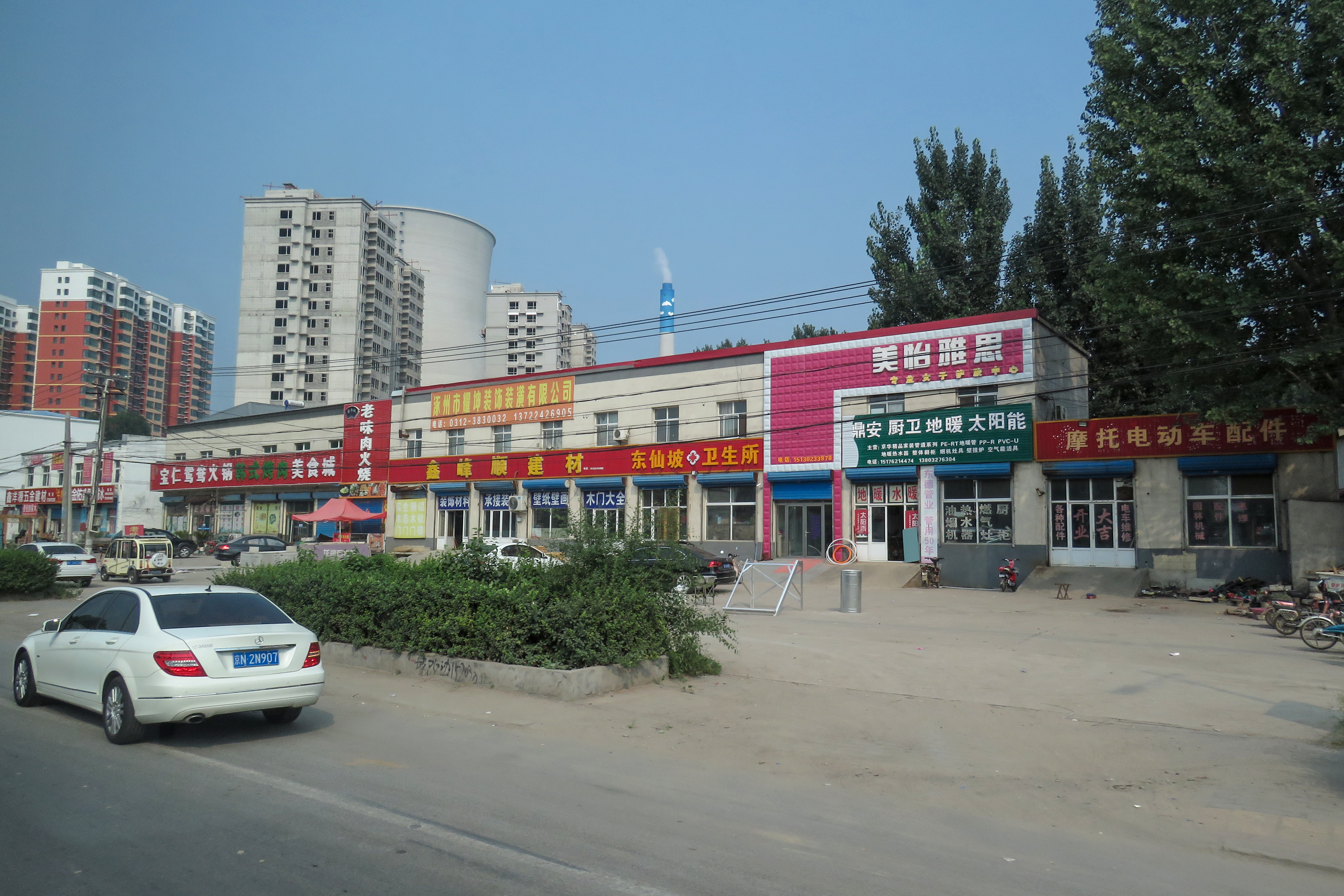
Shops and hospital in Dongxianpo

Dongxianpo (Chinese: 东仙坡镇; pinyin: Dōngxiānpō Zhèn) is a town under the administration of Zhuozhou, a county-level city in Baoding, Hebei Province, China. According to the 2010 census, it had a population of 31,410. The population consisted of 16,161 males and 15,249 females. The age distribution included 4,584 individuals under the age of 14, 24,469 between 15 and 64 years old, and 2,357 aged 65 and over.

== See also ==
- List of township-level divisions of Hebei
