= Zhidu Temple Pagoda =

Temple in China

Coordinates: 39.495817°N 115.966449°E

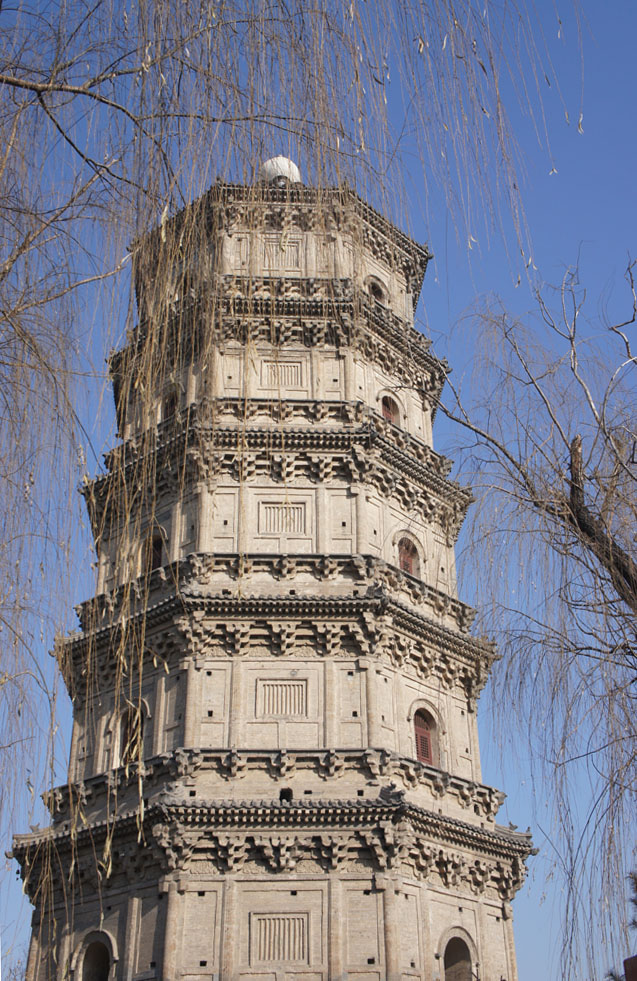
Zhidu Temple Pagoda

The Zhidu Temple Pagoda (Chinese: 智度寺塔; pinyin: Zhìdù sìtǎ) of Zhuozhou, Hebei province, China, is a pagoda dating from the Liao dynasty (907–1125).

== History ==
The pagoda remained intact until 1925. That year, as a result of Chiang Kai-shek's Northern Expedition, fighting erupted in the Zhuozhou area. Amid fighting, the pagoda was repeatedly shelled which resulted in heavy damage. In 1976, nearby Tangshan experienced a massive earthquake, which caused the pagoda to crack. Because of all the damage to the pagoda, its height had been reduced from 44 meters to 39 meters. In order to repair all the damage, the pagoda was renovated by the Hebei government in 2005.

== Pagoda ==
The pagoda is eight-sided, has five floors and is built from black bricks. The tapering of the pagoda is subtle, with the first floor's diameter being 6.5 meters and the top floor's 5.05 meters. Each floor's support pillars are not tapered, a particular feature of many Liao dynasty pagodas.
