= Qingliangsi Subdistrict =

Qingliangsi Subdistrict 清凉寺街道
- Subdistrict
- Qingliangsi Jiedao
- Location in Hebei Location in China
- Coordinates: 39°29′11.9″N 115°59′37.5″E
- Country: People's Republic of China
- Province: Hebei
- Prefecture-level city: Baoding
- County-level city: Zhuozhou

Area
  - Total: 33.43 km^{2} (12.91 sq mi)

Population (2010)
  - Total: 66,554
  - Density: 1,991/km^{2} (5,160/sq mi)
- Time zone: UTC+8 (China Standard)
- Local dialing code: 312

Qingliangsi Subdistrict (Chinese: 清凉寺街道; pinyin: Qīngliángsì Jiēdào) is a subdistrict of Zhuozhou, Baoding, Hebei, China. According to the 2010 census, Qingliangsi had a population of 66,554, including 32,875 males and 33,679 females. The population was distributed as follows: 10,724 people aged under 14, 50,754 people aged between 15 and 64, and 5,076 people aged over 65.

== See also ==
- List of township-level divisions of Hebei
