= 2022 State of the Nation Address (Philippines) =

Speech by Philippine President Bongbong Marcos

First State of the Nation Address of President Bongbong Marcos
- Full video of the speech as published by Radio Television Malacañang
- Date: July 25, 2022
- Duration: 1 hour and 14 minutes
- Venue: Session Hall, Batasang Pambansa Complex
- Location: Quezon City, Philippines; 14°41′36″N 121°5′40″E
- Filmed by: Radio Television Malacañang
- Participants: Bongbong Marcos; Migz Zubiri; Martin Romualdez
- Languages: English, Filipino
- Previous: 2021 State of the Nation Address
- Next: 2023 State of the Nation Address
- Website: stateofthenation.gov.ph// stateofthenation.gov.ph/sona/2022//

The 2022 State of the Nation Address was the first State of the Nation Address (SONA) delivered by Bongbong Marcos, the 17th president of the Philippines, on July 25, 2022, at the Batasang Pambansa Complex.

== Preparations ==
On May 31, 2022, Marcos met with several members of the Congress of the Philippines to discuss his upcoming first State of the Nation Address. The Presidential Security Group hosted an inter-agency meeting on July 11 to discuss the security preparations for the upcoming SONA. SONA attendees were required to undergo a RT-PCR and a rapid antigen test. Other health precautions were also implemented, including the mandatory wearing of face masks and face shields for those entering the session hall. 21,853 security personnel were deployed to the Batasang Pambansa. The Philippine National Police imposed a gun ban in Metro Manila from July 22 to 27.

In writing the address, Marcos was aided by undersecretaries Ina Reformina, Maria Pamela Pedroche and Marlon Purificacion who were newly hired at the Presidential Communications Operations Office (PCOO).

== Seating and guests ==
On July 4, 2022, House of Representatives Secretary-General Mark Llandro Mendoza announced that it was expected that 315 members and 24 senators would attend the event, a total of 339 people. Mendoza also announced that the number of media to be allowed into the Batasang Pambansa would be limited. Former presidents Joseph Estrada and Gloria Macapagal Arroyo confirmed attendance to the SONA, however Arroyo tested positive for COVID. She instead attended the SONA online. Vice President Sara Duterte attended the event in person.

== Address content and delivery ==
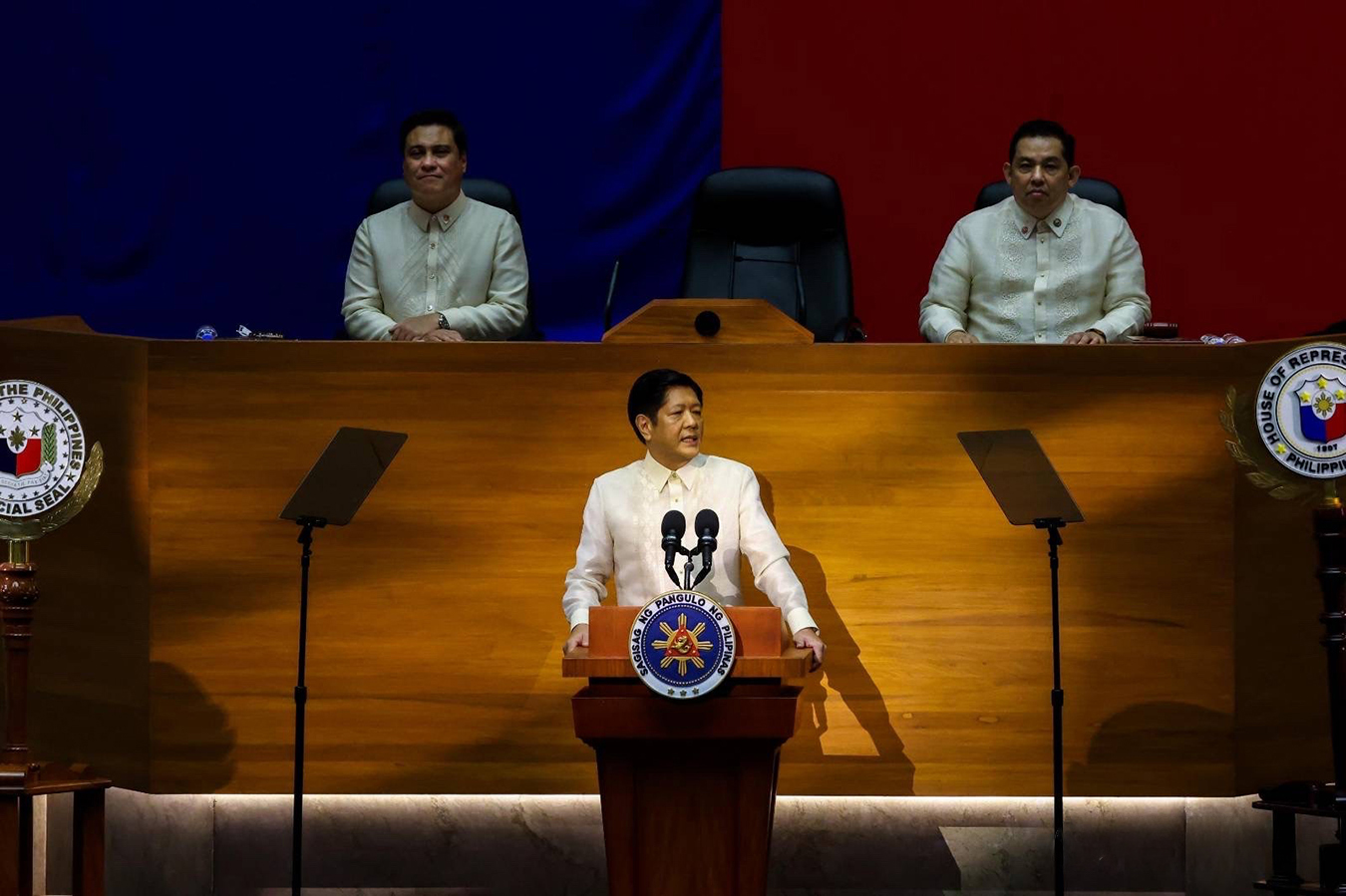
President Bongbong Marcos delivering his first State of the Nation Address on July 25, 2022

President Bongbong Marcos reported on the outcome of programs and policies that were promulgated under his predecessor, Rodrigo Duterte.

Before he started his speech, the singing of Lupang Hinirang, the national anthem which was led by the Samiweng Singers, a choral group based from his home province, Ilocos Norte. It was followed by the ecumenical prayer led to the audience by the representatives of various religious groups. Marcos started his speech at 4:05pm and ended at 5:19pm. He was joined by Senate President Migz Zubiri and his first cousin, House Speaker Martin Romualdez.

| Preceded by 2021 State of the Nation Address | State of the Nation Address; 2022 | Succeeded by 2023 State of the Nation Address |
