= Dongsheng Subdistrict, Gaobeidian =

Dongsheng Subdistrict 东盛街道
- Subdistrict
- Dongsheng Jiedao
- Location in Hebei Location in China
- Coordinates: 39°19′25.2″N 115°55′09.8″E
- Country: People's Republic of China
- Province: Hebei
- Prefecture-level city: Baoding
- County-level city: Gaobeidian

Area
  - Total: 19.42 km^{2} (7.50 sq mi)

Population (2010)
  - Total: 25,694
  - Density: 1,323/km^{2} (3,430/sq mi)
- Time zone: UTC+8 (China Standard)
- Local dialing code: 312

Dongsheng Subdistrict (Chinese: 东盛街道; pinyin: Dōngshèng Jiēdào) is an urban subdistrict in Gaobeidian, Baoding, Hebei, China. According to the 2010 census, Dongsheng Subdistrict had a population of 25,694, including 12,934 males and 12,760 females. The population was distributed as follows: 3,985 people aged under 14, 19,795 people aged between 15 and 64, and 1,914 people aged over 65.

== See also ==
- List of township-level divisions of Hebei
