= Xincheng, Gaobeidian =

Xincheng 新城镇
- Town
- Xincheng Zhen
- Location in Hebei Location in China
- Coordinates: 39°14′40.4″N 115°59′18.1″E
- Country: People's Republic of China
- Province: Hebei
- Prefecture-level city: Baoding
- County-level city: Gaobeidian

Area
  - Total: 70.94 km^{2} (27.39 sq mi)

Population (2010)
  - Total: 44,539
  - Density: 627.8/km^{2} (1,626/sq mi)
- Time zone: UTC+8 (China Standard)
- Local dialing code: 312

Xincheng (Chinese: 新城镇; pinyin: Xīnchéng Zhèn) is a town located in Gaobeidian, Baoding, Hebei, China. According to the 2010 census, Xincheng had a population of 44,539, including 22,392 males and 22,147 females. The population was distributed as follows: 7,178 people aged under 14, 33,141 people aged between 15 and 64, and 4,220 people aged over 65.

== See also ==
- List of township-level divisions of Hebei
