= Sizhuang =

Sizhuang 泗庄镇
- Town
- Sizhuang Zhen
- Location in Hebei Location in China
- Coordinates: 39°10′53.4″N 116°03′01.9″E
- Country: People's Republic of China
- Province: Hebei
- Prefecture-level city: Baoding
- County-level city: Gaobeidian

Area
  - Total: 50.42 km^{2} (19.47 sq mi)

Population (2010)
  - Total: 35,392
  - Density: 701.9/km^{2} (1,818/sq mi)
- Time zone: UTC+8 (China Standard)
- Local dialing code: 312

Sizhuang (Chinese: 泗庄镇; pinyin: Sìzhuāng Zhèn) is a town located in Gaobeidian, Baoding, Hebei, China. According to the 2010 census, Sizhuang had a population of 35,392, including 17,936 males and 17,456 females. The population was distributed as follows: 5,285 people aged under 14, 26,949 people aged between 15 and 64, and 3,158 people aged over 65.

== See also ==
- List of township-level divisions of Hebei
