= Gaoguanzhuang =

Gaoguanzhuang 高官庄镇
- Town
- Gaoguanzhuang Zhen
- Location in Hebei Location in China
- Coordinates: 39°23′14.1″N 116°02′37.0″E
- Country: People's Republic of China
- Province: Hebei
- Prefecture-level city: Baoding
- County-level city: Zhuozhou

Area
  - Total: 41.52 km^{2} (16.03 sq mi)

Population (2010)
  - Total: 25,389
  - Density: 611.5/km^{2} (1,584/sq mi)
- Time zone: UTC+8 (China Standard)
- Area code: 312

Gaoguanzhuang (Chinese: 高官庄镇; pinyin: Gāoguānzhuāng Zhèn) is a town under the administration of Zhuozhou, a county-level city in Baoding, Hebei Province, China. According to the 2010 census, it had a population of 25,389. The population consisted of 12,889 males and 12,500 females. The age distribution included 3,680 individuals under the age of 14, 19,296 between 15 and 64 years old, and 2,413 aged 65 and over.

== See also ==
- List of township-level divisions of Hebei
