= Dongchengfang =

Dongchengfang 东城坊镇
- Town
- Dongchengfang Zhen
- Location in Hebei Location in China
- Coordinates: 39°28′40.0″N 115°50′46.9″E
- Country: People's Republic of China
- Province: Hebei
- Prefecture-level city: Baoding
- County-level city: Zhuozhou

Area
  - Total: 98.36 km^{2} (37.98 sq mi)

Population (2010)
  - Total: 42,064
  - Density: 427.6/km^{2} (1,107/sq mi)
- Time zone: UTC+8 (China Standard)
- Local dialing code: 312

Dongchengfang (Chinese: 东城坊镇; pinyin: Dōngchéngfāng Zhèn) is a town in Zhuozhou, Baoding, Hebei Province, China. As of the 2010 census, it had a population of 42,064, comprising 20,991 males and 21,073 females. Age distribution included 6,059 individuals under 14 years, 32,817 aged 15–64, and 3,188 over 65.

== See also ==
- List of township-level divisions of Hebei
