= Xinghua Road Subdistrict, Gaobeidian =

Xinghua Road Subdistrict 兴华路街道
- Subdistrict
- Location in Hebei
- Coordinates: 39°19′51″N 115°52′10″E
- Country: People's Republic of China
- Province: Hebei
- Prefecture-level city: Baoding
- District: Gaobeidian
- Village-level divisions: 19 residential communities
- Elevation: 33 m (108 ft)
- Time zone: UTC+8 (China Standard)
- Postal code: 074000
- Area code: 0312

Xinghua Road Subdistrict (simplified Chinese: 兴华路街道; traditional Chinese: 興華路街道; pinyin: Xīnghuá Lù Jiēdào) is a subdistrict of the city of Gaobeidian, Hebei, People's Republic of China. As of 2011, it has 19 residential communities (社区) under its administration.

== See also ==
- List of township-level divisions of Hebei
