= Kaishan Temple =

Buddhist temple in Gaobeidian, China

Coordinates: 39°14′45″N 115°58′58″E

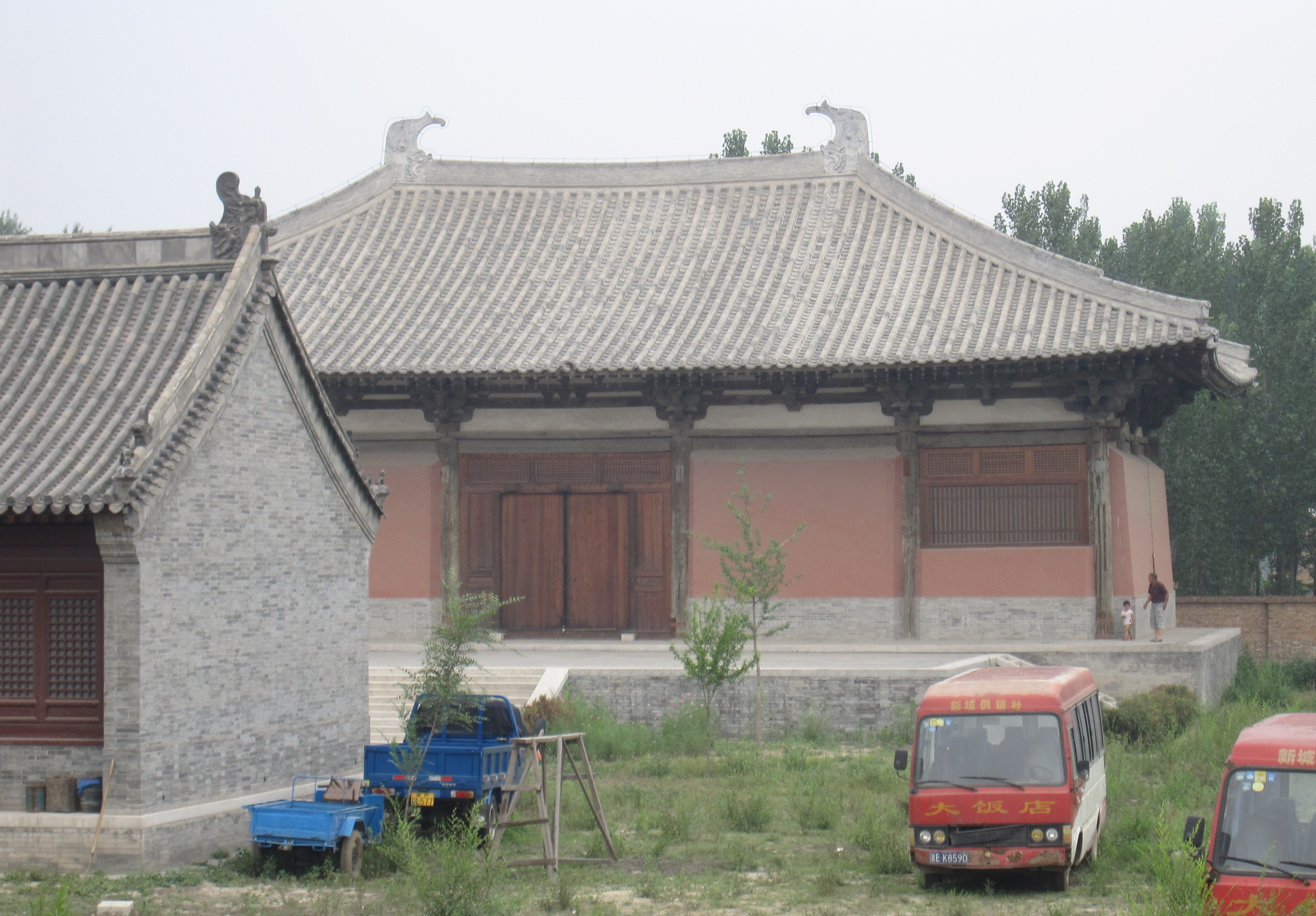
- The temple's Mahavira Hall

Religion
- Affiliation: Buddhist
- Province: Hebei

Location
- Location: Xincheng, near Gaobeidian
- Interactive map of Kaishan Temple

Architecture
- Completed: 1033 CE; Liao dynasty

Kaishan Temple
- Traditional Chinese: 開善寺
- Simplified Chinese: 开善寺
Transcriptions
Standard Mandarin
- Hanyu Pinyin: Kāishàn Sì

Kaishan Temple is a Buddhist temple located in Xincheng village near Gaobeidian, Hebei Province, China. The temple was first founded in the Tang dynasty, and grew large and important in the subsequent centuries until declining in recent centuries. In the 20th century, the main hall of the temple, dating from 1033 during the Liao dynasty, was used as both a school and as a granary. In 2002, the hall underwent a restoration that was completed in 2007.

== History ==
The current temple was founded during the Tang dynasty, prior to the founding of Xincheng in 832 CE. In 929 CE, Xincheng was walled, with Kaishan Temple located in the northeast corner of the walled town. During this time the temple was known to locals as ‘Dasi’, literally, ‘Big Temple’. The oldest structure that is currently standing at the temple site is the main hall, which according to a date written on a beam within the temple, was built during the Liao dynasty in 1033. By the sixteenth century, the temple had become very large, but by the early 20th century it was in decline. In 1928, the main hall became a Sun Yat-sen educational hall, and ceased to function as a temple. During the Cultural Revolution, many houses were built on the grounds of the temple, damaging the temple's surroundings. In 2001, a restoration project funded by the government began with the goal of returning the temple to its prior state.

== Main Hall ==
The Main or Mahavira Hall (大雄宝殿, Dàxíongbǎo Diàn) is five by three bays and measures 30.4 by 18.5 meters in size. It is built on a 1.11-meter-high (3.6 ft) stone platform, and has a large yuetai in front of it which measures 27.6 by 11.4 meters. Columns implanted into square stone bases support massive eaves whose length is 55% of the columns’ height. The back and side pillars incline towards the interior of the hall, a feature that is associated with pre-Yuan dynasty Chinese architecture. Prior to its conversion in 1928 to a school, the hall's main devotional image was probably Guanyin, with four esoteric boddhisattvas on either side, as well as luohans on the sides of the hall.
