= Beicheng Subdistrict, Gaobeidian =

Beicheng Subdistrict 北城街道
- Subdistrict
- Beicheng Jiedao
- Location in Hebei Location in China
- Coordinates: 39°21′06.0″N 115°55′47.3″E
- Country: People's Republic of China
- Province: Hebei
- Prefecture-level city: Baoding
- County-level city: Gaobeidian

Area
  - Total: 25.16 km^{2} (9.71 sq mi)

Population (2010)
  - Total: 21,350
  - Density: 848.5/km^{2} (2,198/sq mi)
- Time zone: UTC+8 (China Standard)
- Local dialing code: 312

Beicheng Subdistrict (Chinese: 北城街道; pinyin: Běichéng Jiēdào) is an urban subdistrict in Gaobeidian, Baoding, Hebei, China. According to the 2010 census, Beicheng Subdistrict had a population of 21,350, including 10,693 males and 10,657 females. The population was distributed as follows: 3,230 people aged under 14, 16,474 people aged between 15 and 64, and 1,646 people aged over 65.

== See also ==
- List of township-level divisions of Hebei
