= 2024 State of the Nation Address (Philippines) =

State of the Nation Address of the Philippines

Third State of the Nation Address of President Bongbong Marcos
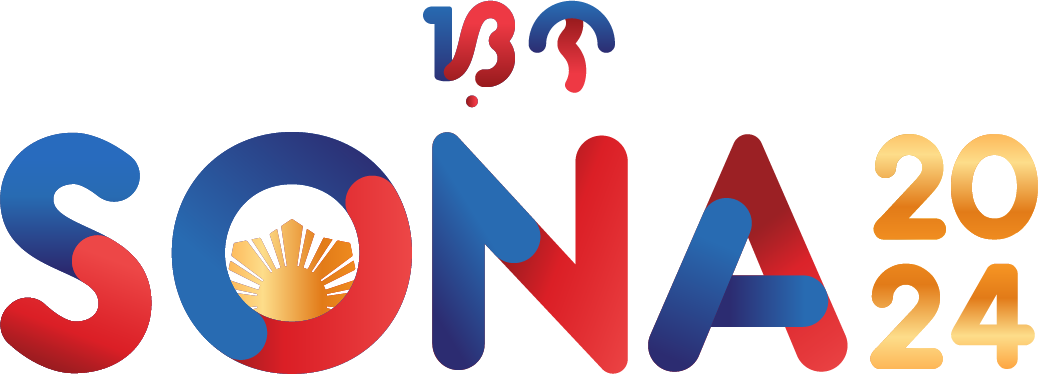
- Official SONA 2024 logo
- Full video of the speech as published by Radio Television Malacañang
- Date: July 22, 2024
- Duration: 1 hour and 22 minutes
- Venue: Session Hall, Batasang Pambansa Complex
- Location: Quezon City, Philippines; 14°41′36″N 121°5′40″E
- Filmed by: Radio Television Malacañang
- Participants: Bongbong Marcos; Francis Escudero; Martin Romualdez
- Languages: English, Filipino
- Previous: 2023 State of the Nation Address
- Next: 2025 State of the Nation Address
- Website: econgress.gov.ph/sona2024/ stateofthenation.gov.ph/sona/2024//

The 2024 State of the Nation Address was the third State of the Nation Address (SONA) delivered by Bongbong Marcos, the 17th president of the Philippines, on July 22, 2024, at the Batasang Pambansa Complex.

== Preparations ==
An estimate of ₱20 million was given for the expenses related to the SONA which includes equipment, logistics, meetings and food. The Philippine National Police deployed 22,000 personnel around Metro Manila to secure the speech.

== Seating and guests ==
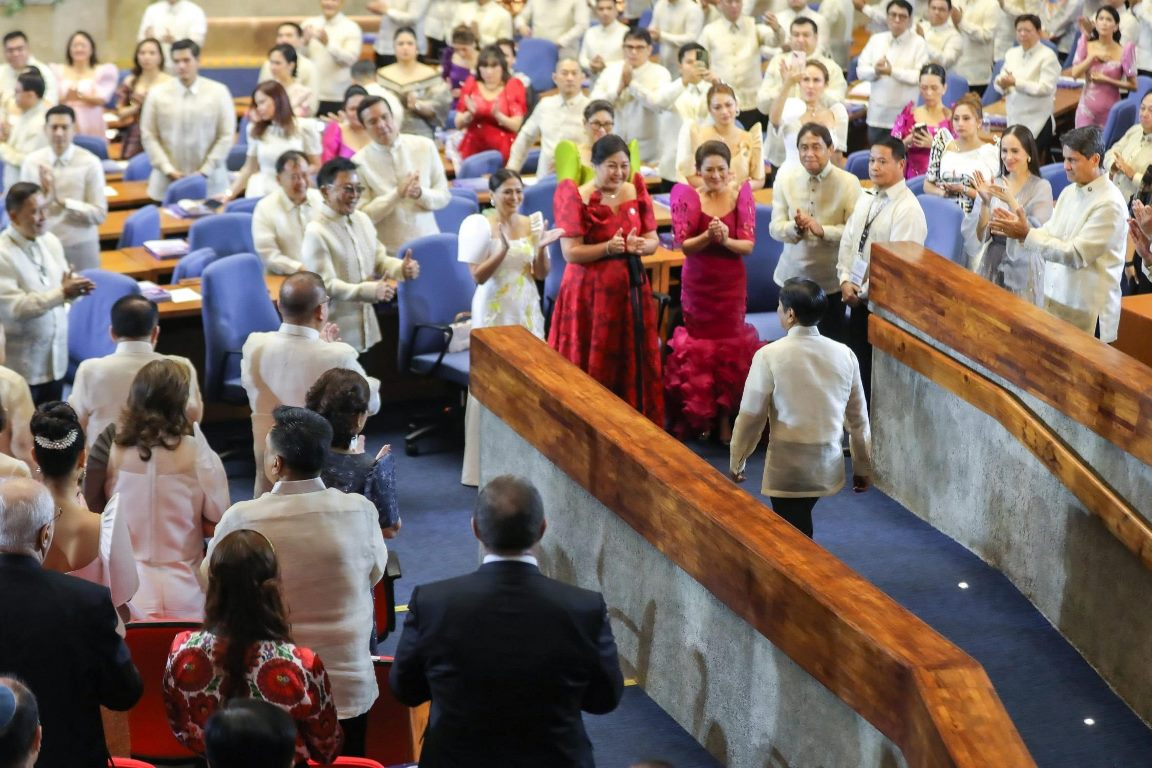
Guests greeting Marcos at the plenary hall of the Batasang Pambansa.

House Secretary General Reginald Velasco said that he expected about 2,000 guests will attend the speech, making it the largest SONA by attendance. There were 1,814 seats in the plenary.

Former presidents Joseph Estrada and Gloria Macapagal Arroyo, who is also the incumbent representative from Pampanga's 2nd district, attended the SONA.

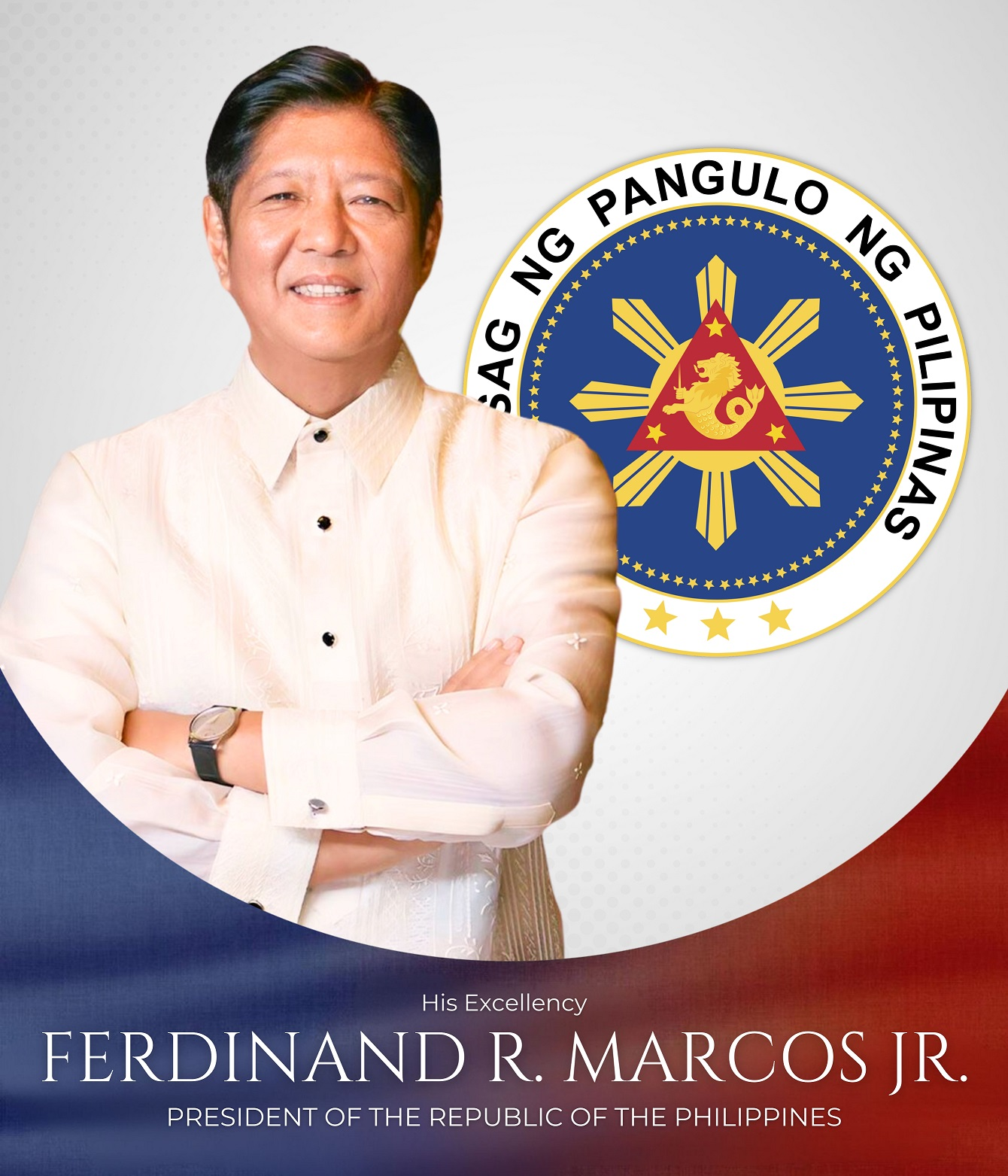
Marcos's 2024 SONA portrait

A noted absence was Vice President Sara Duterte, who self-appointed herself as the "designated survivor", although she did not elaborate further on what she meant with the term which is only relevant to a contingency plan in the United States presidential line of succession. According to her office, she instead went to Bohol for Bohol Day and the wake of the province's vice governor Dionisio Victor Balite, and chose not to watch the SONA on screen. Likewise, her father, former president Rodrigo Duterte, and her predecessors Leni Robredo, Jejomar Binay, and Noli de Castro did not attend the SONA. Duterte-allied Senators Bong Go and Ronald dela Rosa were also absent, with Go citing medical reasons, although they were able to attend the opening of the third regular session of the 19th Congress earlier that day.

== Address ==
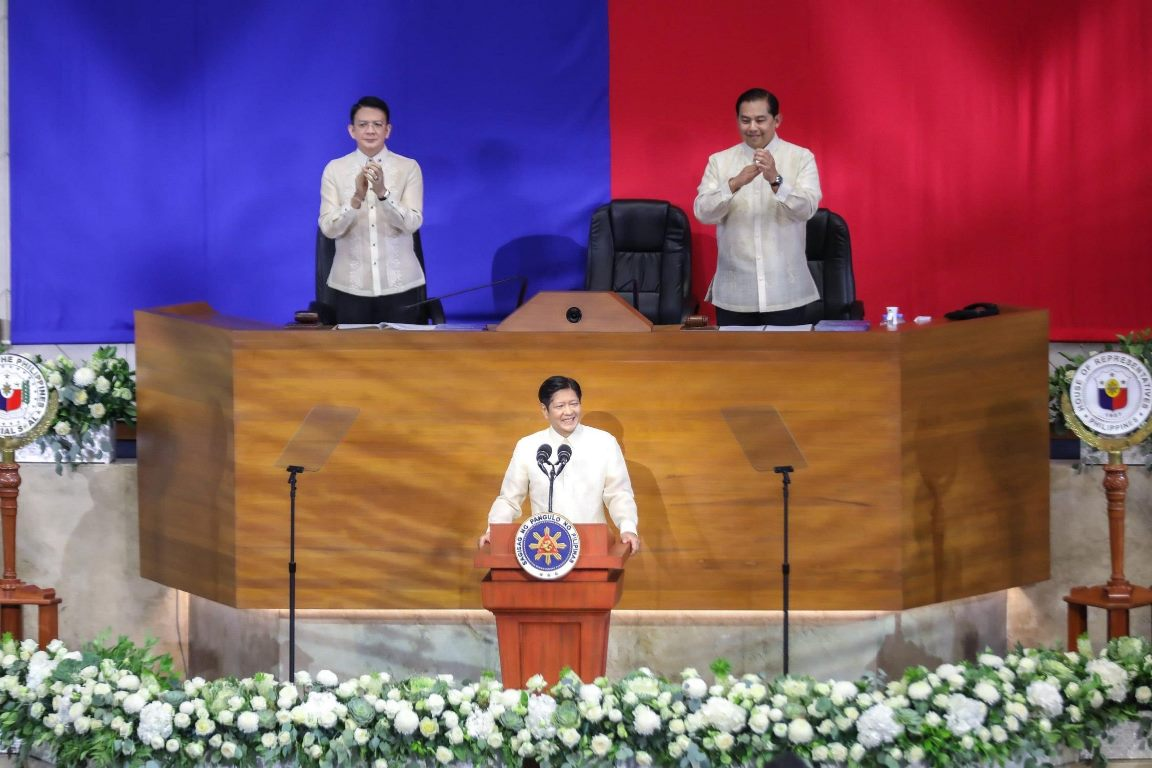
The speech

The speech was covered by state-outlet Radio Television Malacañang. Before President Bongbong Marcos started his speech, the singing of "Lupang Hinirang" by Blessie Abagat was held. It was followed by the ecumenical prayer led by representatives of various religious groups. Marcos started his speech at 4:05pm and ended at 5:27pm, both times PHT, lasting for 1 hour and 22 minutes. He was joined by Senate President Francis Escudero and his first cousin, House Speaker Martin Romualdez.

Marcos highlighted the achievements of his administration, with political observers noting that the most memorable points he expressed were three pronouncements that could be interpreted as policy reversals of the previous Duterte administration: an ongoing "bloodless" program against illegal drugs, the country standing its ground against China on its own sovereignty claims over the South China Sea, and the immediate ban of Philippine Offshore Gaming Operators (POGO).

== Reception ==
Political strategist Alan German considered Marcos's address to be "very well executed" and the best delivered SONA out of the three the president has given so far. Academic Cielo Magno expressed a mixed reaction to the address, considering it to be "refreshing" in its form compared to those delivered by Marcos's predecessor Rodrigo Duterte and noteworthy in its reversal of policies initiated by Duterte but lacking in concrete details that could have reinforced his listed accomplishments and plans for the country.

Education Secretary Sonny Angara, having attended 21 SONAs, described the 2024 edition as "easily one of the best."

== Protests ==
The People's SONA, a protest held by progressive groups including the Bagong Alyansang Makabayan, was held along Commonwealth Avenue in Quezon City. They voiced out issues faced by various sectors, including inflation, workers’ salary, the South China Sea dispute, and human rights violations.

On the other hand, a pro-Marcos concert was also held along Commonwealth Avenue. It was marred by the collapse of an LED screen due to heavy rains and strong winds brought about by the southwestern monsoon enhanced by Typhoon Gaemi (Carina), injuring one person.

Preceded by 2023 State of the Nation Address	State of the Nation Address; 2024	Succeeded by 2025 State of the Nation Address
