= 2023 State of the Nation Address (Philippines) =

State of the Nation Address of the Philippines

Second State of the Nation Address of President Bongbong Marcos
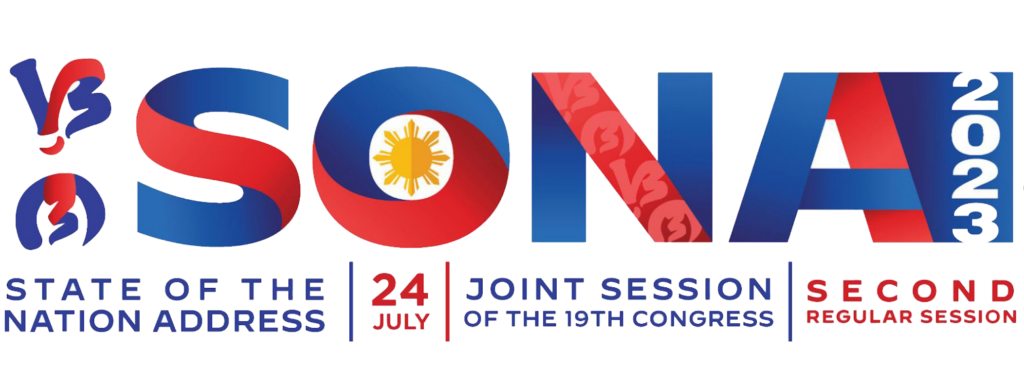
- Official SONA 2023 logo
- Full video of the speech as published by Radio Television Malacañang
- Date: July 24, 2023
- Duration: 1 hour and 11 minutes
- Venue: Session Hall, Batasang Pambansa Complex
- Location: Quezon City, Philippines; 14°41′36″N 121°5′40″E
- Filmed by: Radio Television Malacañang
- Participants: Bongbong Marcos; Migz Zubiri; Martin Romualdez
- Languages: English, Filipino
- Previous: 2022 State of the Nation Address
- Next: 2024 State of the Nation Address
- Website: econgress.gov.ph/sona2023/ stateofthenation.gov.ph/sona/2023//

The 2023 State of the Nation Address was the second State of the Nation Address (SONA) delivered by Bongbong Marcos, the 17th president of the Philippines, on July 24, 2023, at the Batasang Pambansa Complex.

== Preparations ==
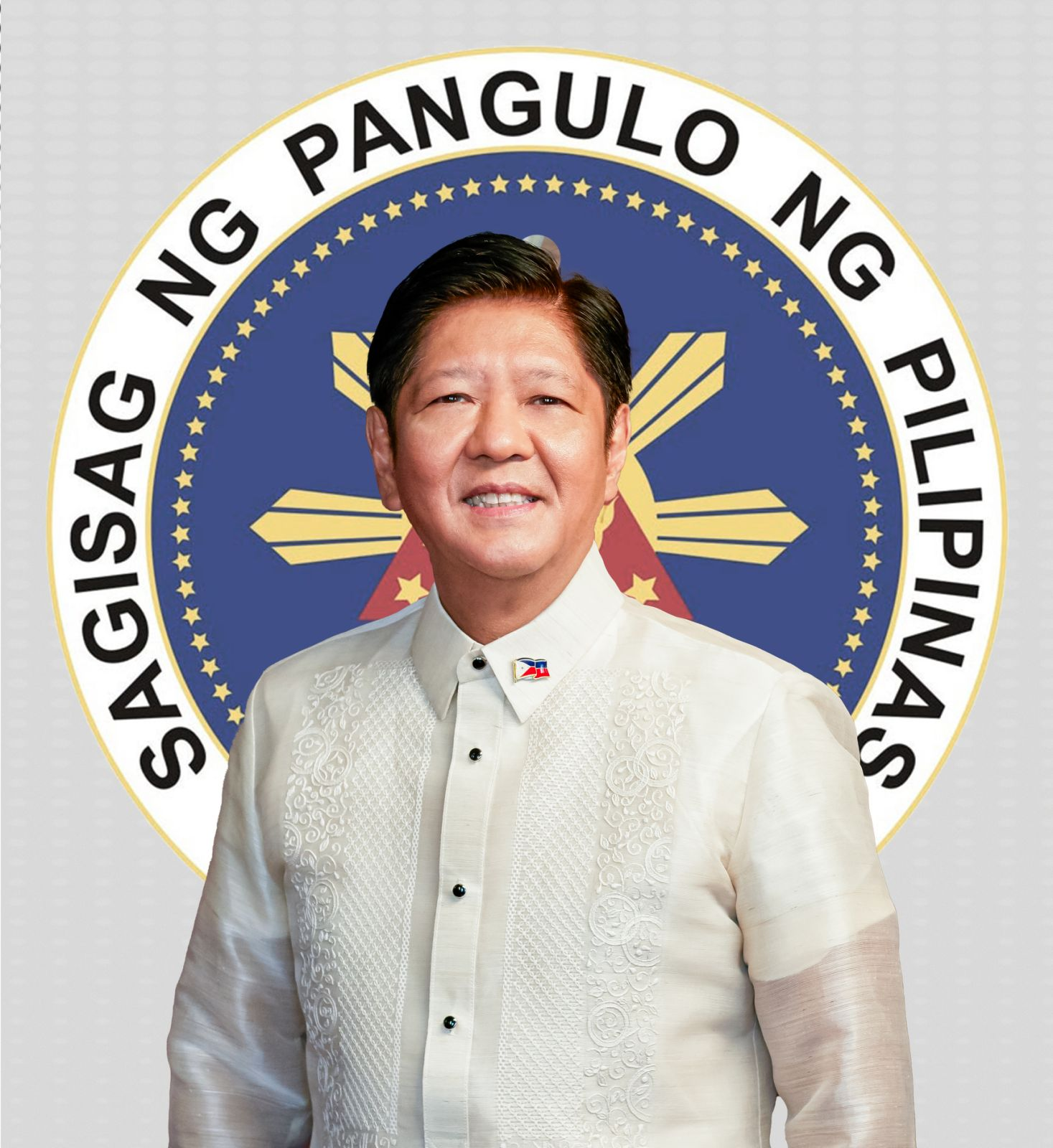
Marcos's 2023 SONA portrait

On July 7, 2023, members of the Quezon City Police District conducted civil disturbance drills at Camp Karingal, Quezon City for the upcoming Second State of the Nation Address of President Bongbong Marcos. According to the Philippine National Police, the PNP would deploy around 22,000 security personnel around the Batasang Pambansa complex, and other critical areas around Metro Manila.

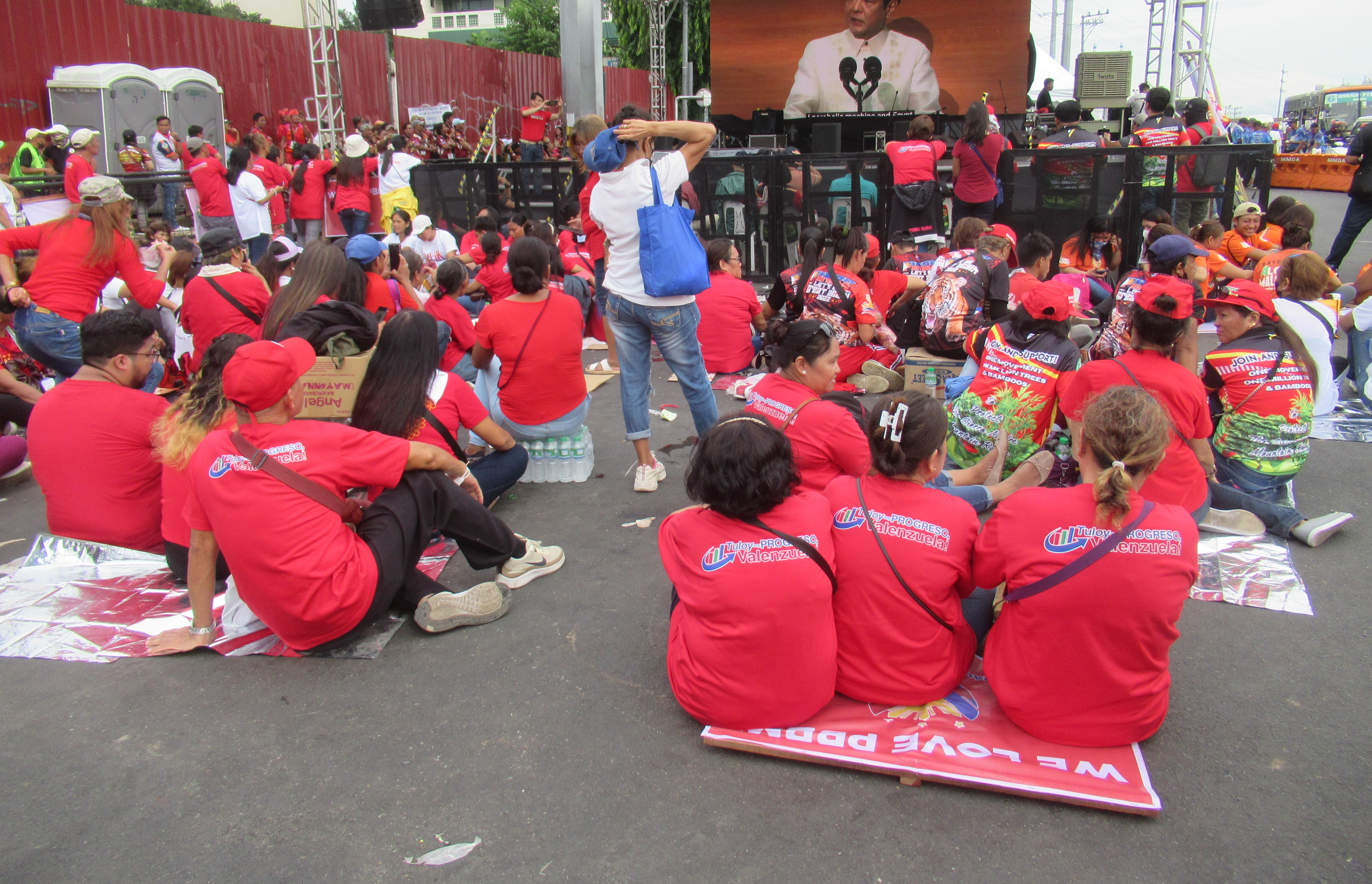
Marcos supporters.

== Seating and guests ==
Former presidents Joseph Estrada, Gloria Macapagal Arroyo, and Rodrigo Duterte confirmed attendance to the SONA, however Duterte later rescinded. According to his aide, Senator Bong Go, he was tired after his personal trip to Beijing, China and instead went back home to Davao City. Vice President Sara Duterte attended the event in person.

== Address content and delivery ==
Before President Bongbong Marcos started his speech, the singing of Lupang Hinirang by Lara Maigue was held. It was followed by the ecumenical prayer led by representatives of various religious groups. Marcos started his speech at 4:06pm and ended at 5:17pm, both times PHT, lasting for 1 hour and 11 minutes. He was joined by Senate President Migz Zubiri and his first cousin, House Speaker Martin Romualdez.

Marcos enumerated the gains during his administration in the past year.

Among the pledges Marcos promised include:

- "Total electrification" of the country by the end of term and a focus on renewable energy.
- Full support of the Bangsamoro peace process stating that there would be no more extension and that the 2025 regional elections shall be held as scheduled.
- Amnesty for Moro rebels and called on the help of the Congress for such move.
- To accept resignation of police personnel involved in the illegal drug trade.

== Protests ==
The People's SONA, a protest held by progressive groups, was held along Commonwealth Avenue. These groups include Bayan, Karapatan, Anakbayan. They called for raising of wages and livelihood initiatives instead of pursuing the Maharlika Fund.

Preceded by 2022 State of the Nation Address	State of the Nation Address; 2023	Succeeded by 2024 State of the Nation Address
