= Zhuozhou =

Zhuozhou 涿州市 Chochow
- County-level city
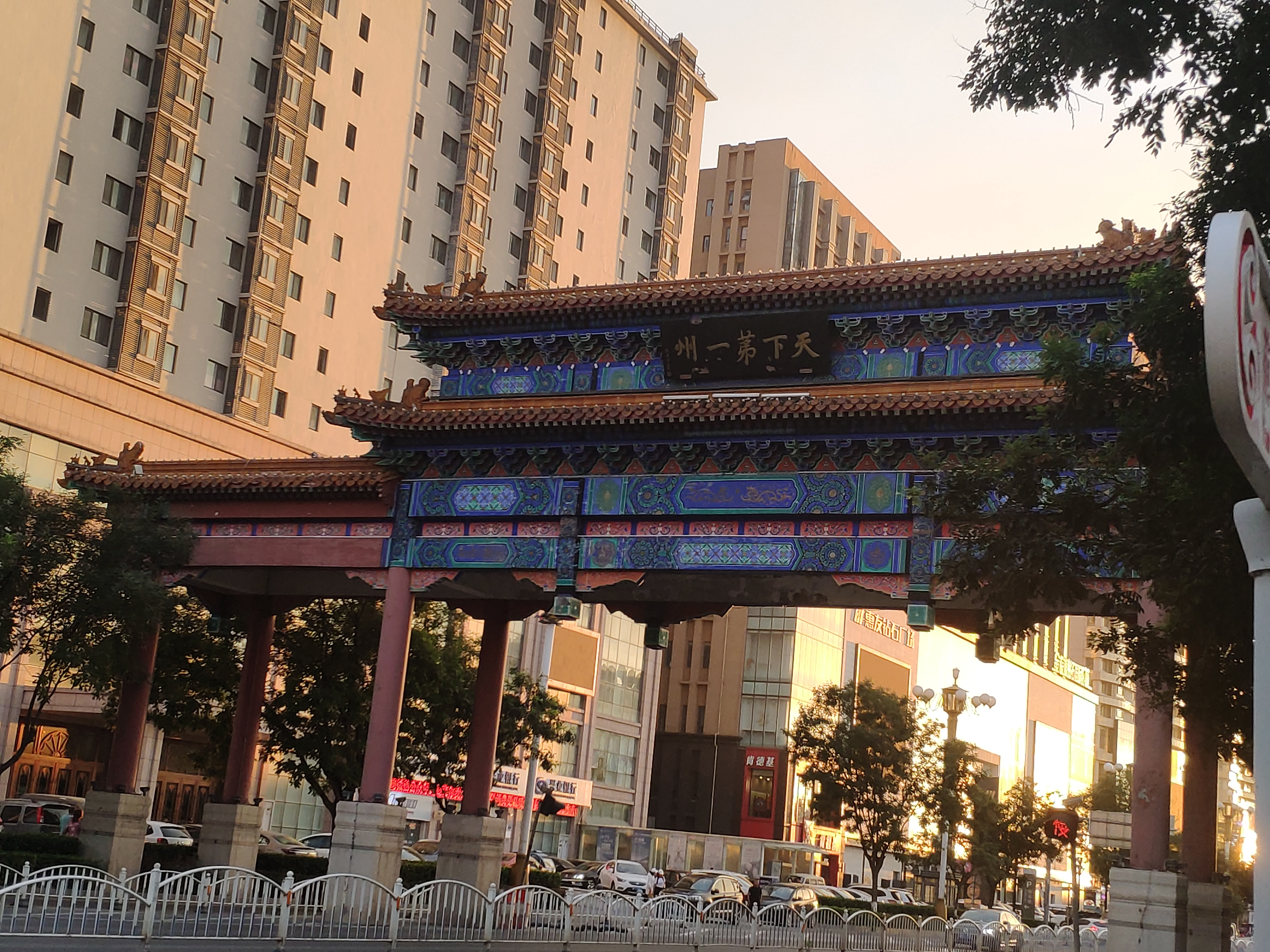
- "Best Prefecture Under Heaven" paifang

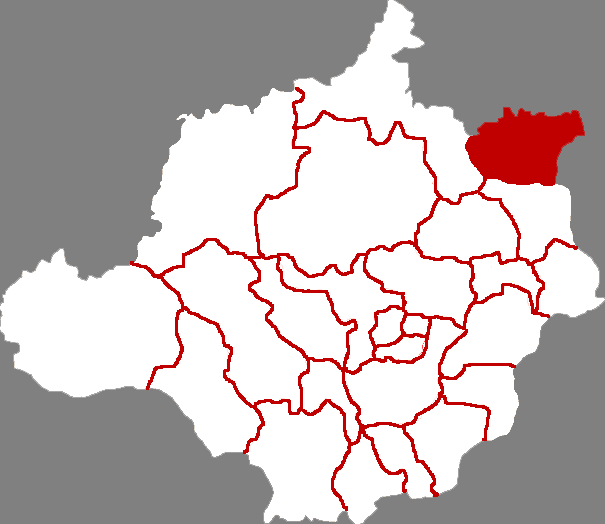
- Location in Baoding

- Location in Hebei
- Coordinates: 39°29′06″N 115°58′26″E
- Country: People's Republic of China
- Province: Hebei
- Prefecture-level city: Baoding
- City seat: Shuangta Subdistrict (双塔街道)

Area
  - County-level city: 751.3 km^{2} (290.1 sq mi)
  - Urban: 52.20 km^{2} (20.15 sq mi)
- Elevation: 37 m (121 ft)

Population (2017)
  - County-level city: 718,000
  - Urban: 354,600
- Time zone: UTC+8 (China Standard)
- Postal code: 072750
- Area code: 0312
- Vehicle registration: 冀F
- Website: www.zhuozhou.gov.cn

Zhuozhou (Chinese: 涿州; pinyin: Zhuōzhōu; Wade–Giles: Cho^{¹}-chou^{¹}) is a county-level city with 628,000 inhabitants in central Hebei province, southwest of Beijing. It is administered by Baoding prefecture-level city. Zhuozhou has 3 subdistricts, 6 towns, 5 townships, and 1 development zone.

== History ==
Zhuozhou was the birthplace of Bai Guang in 1921.

In 1928, the city was the site of a fierce battle between the forces of Fengtien clique warlord Chang Tso-lin and those of the Kuomintang's National Revolutionary Army, with the city falling to the Fengtien after eighty-six days of heavy bombardment.

In September 1937, General Count Hisaichi Terauchi, commander-in-chief of the North China Area Army, sent a column of mechanised infantry supported by cavalry to cut the Jinghan railway at Zhuozhou. The area was lightly defended by provincial troops without proper artillery or planes, as the Chinese strategy at the time rested on defending Paoting with better-equipped central government soldiers.

== Administrative divisions ==
Subdistricts:

- Shuangta Subdistrict (双塔街道), Taoyuan Subdistrict (桃园街道), Qingliangsi Subdistrict (清凉寺街道)

Towns:

- Songlindian (松林店镇), Matou (码头镇), Dongchengfang (东城坊镇), Gaoguanzhuang (高官庄镇), Dongxianpo (东仙坡镇), Baichigan (百尺竿镇)

Townships:

- Yihezhuang Township (义和庄乡), Lintun Township (林屯乡), Sunzhuang Township (孙庄乡), Douzhuang Township (豆庄乡), Diaowo Township (刁窝乡)

== Climate ==
Zhuozhou is at a high risk of floods. It was heavily impacted by the 2023 China floods, and more than a sixth of the city's 600,000 residents had to evacuate.

Zhuozhou has been described by Hebei communist party secretary Ni Yuefeng as being able to "serve as a moat for the capital" using flood storage and detention areas in the aftermath of flooding in Beijing as a result of Typhoon Doksuri.

Climate data for Zhuozhou, elevation 29 m (95 ft), (1991–2020 normals, extremes 1981–2025)
Month	Jan	Feb	Mar	Apr	May	Jun	Jul	Aug	Sep	Oct	Nov	Dec	Year
Record high °C (°F)	14.3 (57.7)	17.0 (62.6)	30.3 (86.5)	31.5 (88.7)	37.5 (99.5)	40.4 (104.7)	40.4 (104.7)	36.2 (97.2)	34.3 (93.7)	30.8 (87.4)	22.3 (72.1)	14.8 (58.6)	40.4 (104.7)
Mean daily maximum °C (°F)	2.0 (35.6)	6.0 (42.8)	13.8 (56.8)	21.1 (70.0)	27.3 (81.1)	31.0 (87.8)	31.9 (89.4)	30.4 (86.7)	26.5 (79.7)	19.4 (66.9)	10.3 (50.5)	3.4 (38.1)	18.6 (65.5)
Daily mean °C (°F)	−4.5 (23.9)	−0.5 (31.1)	7.3 (45.1)	14.8 (58.6)	21.0 (69.8)	25.1 (77.2)	26.9 (80.4)	25.5 (77.9)	20.4 (68.7)	12.7 (54.9)	4.1 (39.4)	−2.7 (27.1)	12.5 (54.5)
Mean daily minimum °C (°F)	−9.5 (14.9)	−5.7 (21.7)	1.3 (34.3)	8.3 (46.9)	14.5 (58.1)	19.5 (67.1)	22.4 (72.3)	21.2 (70.2)	15.4 (59.7)	7.4 (45.3)	−0.7 (30.7)	−7.2 (19.0)	7.2 (45.0)
Record low °C (°F)	−22.0 (−7.6)	−17.0 (1.4)	−8.6 (16.5)	−1.8 (28.8)	6.1 (43.0)	12.1 (53.8)	15.7 (60.3)	12.4 (54.3)	5.8 (42.4)	−5.0 (23.0)	−9.8 (14.4)	−20.0 (−4.0)	−22.0 (−7.6)
Average precipitation mm (inches)	2.3 (0.09)	5.3 (0.21)	7.8 (0.31)	25.2 (0.99)	36.5 (1.44)	78.3 (3.08)	173.4 (6.83)	110.3 (4.34)	50.7 (2.00)	30.3 (1.19)	12.7 (0.50)	2.4 (0.09)	535.2 (21.07)
Average precipitation days (≥ 0.1 mm)	1.8	2.2	2.7	4.9	6.2	9.4	12.3	10.8	7.5	5.1	3.0	1.5	67.4
Average snowy days	3.1	2.1	1.0	0.1	0	0	0	0	0	0	1.5	2.5	10.3
Average relative humidity (%)	53	48	45	48	54	62	75	78	73	68	64	57	60
Mean monthly sunshine hours	181.1	184.6	236.2	251.9	274.0	231.8	203.0	212.4	210.3	195.6	166.4	168.0	2,515.3
Percentage possible sunshine	60	61	63	63	62	52	45	51	57	57	56	58	57
Source: China Meteorological Administration

== Transportation ==
=== Railroads ===
- Beijing–Guangzhou Railway: Zhuozhou Railway Station
- Beijing–Shijiazhuang High-Speed Railway: Zhuozhou East Railway Station

=== Highways ===
- G4 Beijing–Hong Kong and Macau Expressway
- China National Highway 107
- G95 Capital Region Ring Expressway

== Places of interest ==
- Zhidu Temple Pagoda: A pagoda built in the Liao dynasty.
