= Gaobeidian railway station =

Railway station in Baoding, Hebei, China

Gaobeidian 高碑店
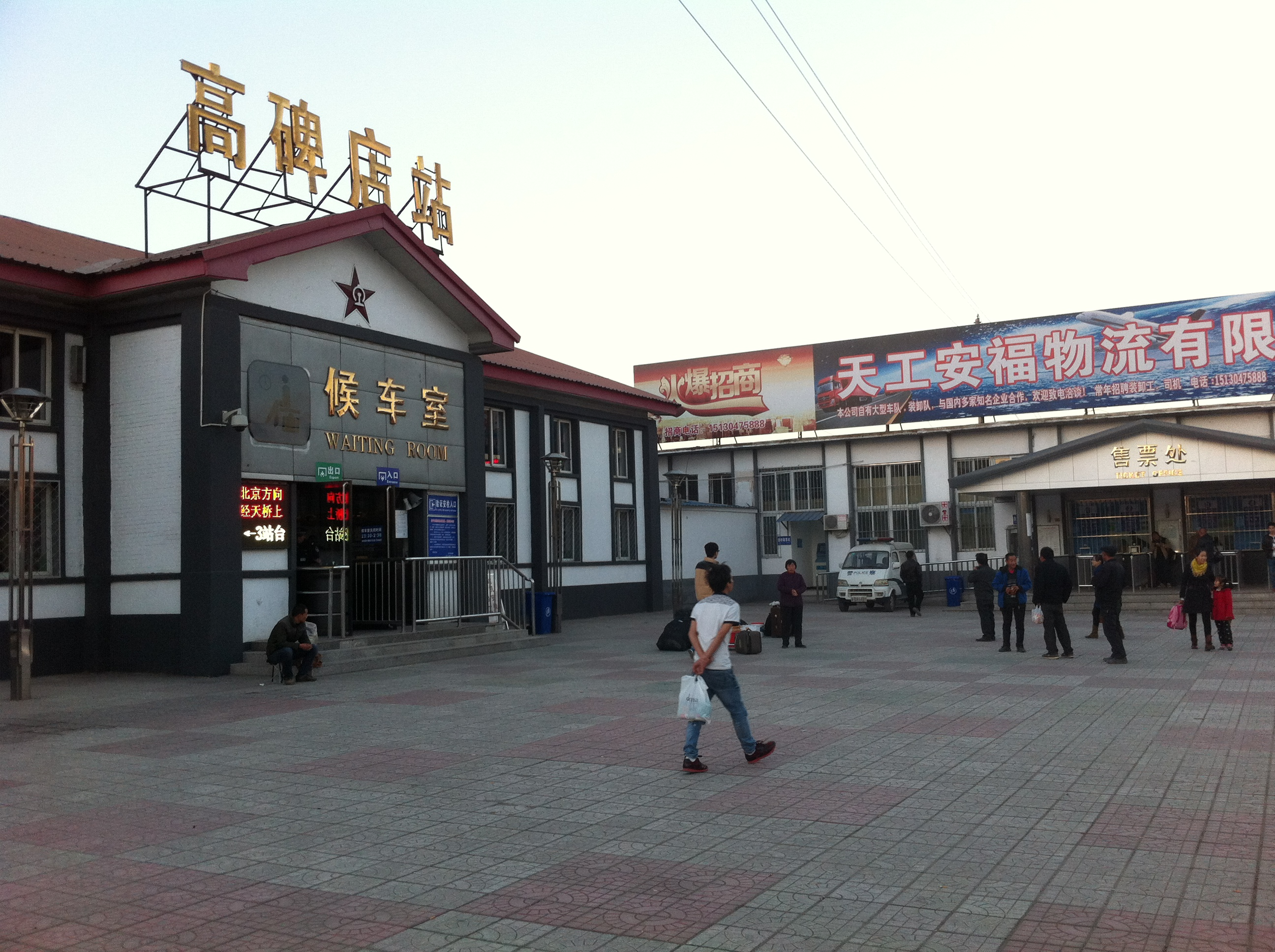

General information
- Location: 1 Yingbin Road; Gaobeidian, Baoding, Hebei; China
- Coordinates: 39°19′40″N 115°51′10″E
- Operator: CR Beijing
- Line: Beijing–Guangzhou railway
- Distance: Beijing–Guangzhou railway: 82 kilometres (51 mi) from Beijing West; 2,214 kilometres (1,376 mi) from Guangzhou
- Platforms: 5 (1 side platform and 2 island platforms)
- Tracks: 8

Other information
- Station code: 20282 (TMIS code); GBP (telegraph code); GBD (Pinyin code)
- Classification: Class 2 station (二等站)

History
- Opened: 1899

Services
Preceding station	China Railway	Following station
Zhuozhou towards Beijing West	Beijing–Guangzhou railway	Xushui towards Guangzhou
Location
- Location within Hebei Location within China

Gaobeidian railway station (Chinese: 高碑店站) is a station on Beijing–Guangzhou railway in Gaobeidian, Baoding, Hebei.

== History ==
The station was opened in 1899.

== See also ==
- Gaobeidian East railway station
