= Gaobeidian =

Gaobeidian 高碑店市
- County-level city
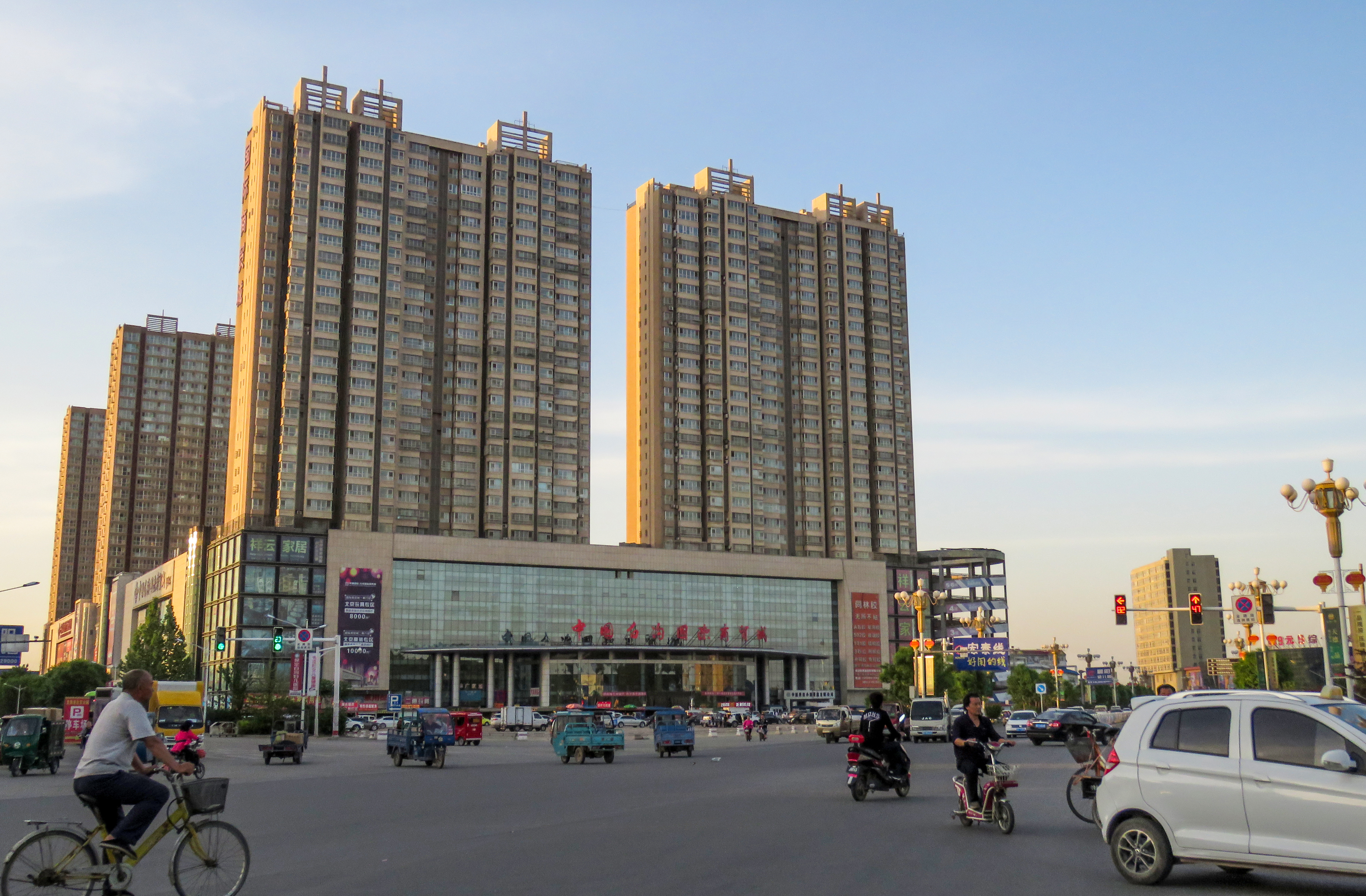

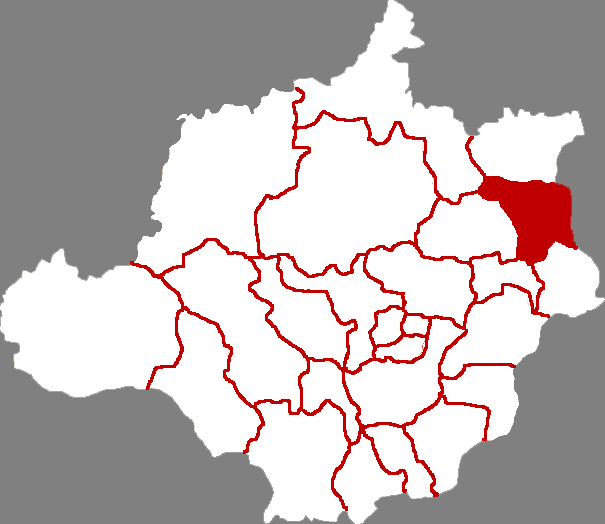
- Location of Gaobeidian in Baoding

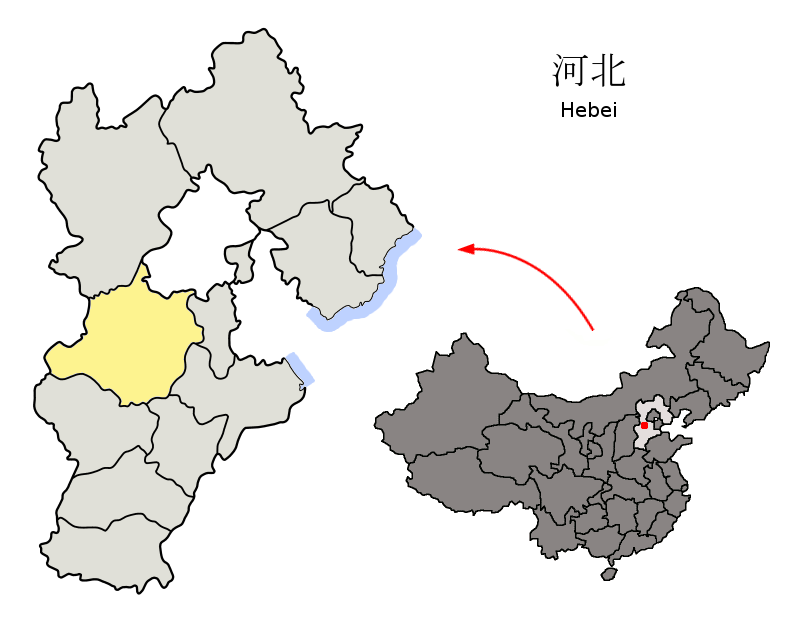
- Location of Baoding in Hebei
- Coordinates: 39.327°N 115.874°E
- Country: People's Republic of China
- Province: Hebei
- Prefecture-level city: Baoding

Area
  - County-level city: 620.0 km^{2} (239.4 sq mi)
  - Urban: 36.80 km^{2} (14.21 sq mi)

Population (2017)
  - County-level city: 588,000
  - Density: 948/km^{2} (2,460/sq mi)
  - Urban: 141,600
- Time zone: UTC+8 (China Standard)
- Postal code: 074000
- Area code: 0312
- Licence plate prefixes: 冀F
- Website: gbd.gov.cn

Gaobeidian (Chinese: 高碑店; pinyin: Gāobēidiàn) is a county-level city in central Hebei province, People's Republic of China. It is under the administration of Baoding Prefecture-level city. Gaobeidian has 4 subdistricts, 6 towns, and 4 townships, and a total of 442 villages. It is 82 kilometres (51 mi) south of Beijing and 68 kilometres (42 mi) north of Baoding.

Gaobeidian City was long known as Xincheng County (simplified Chinese: 新城县; traditional Chinese: 新城縣; pinyin: Xīnchéng Xiàn). In 1993, its name was changed to Gaobeidian City.

== Administrative divisions ==
Subdistricts:

- Heping Subdistrict (和平街道), Juncheng Subdistrict (军城街道), Dongsheng Subdistrict (东盛街道), Beicheng Subdistrict (北城街道), Xinghua Road Subdistrict (兴华路街道)

Towns:

- Fangguan (方官镇), Xincheng (新城镇), Sizhuang (泗庄镇), Baigou (白沟镇), Xinlizhuang (辛立庄镇)

Townships:

- Xiaoguanying Township (肖官营乡), Liangjiaying Township (梁家营乡), Zhangliuzhuang Township (张六庄乡), Dongmaying Township (东马营乡), Xinqiao Township (辛桥乡)

== Climate ==
Climate data for Gaobeidian, elevation 25 m (82 ft), (1991–2020 normals, extremes 1981–2010)
Month	Jan	Feb	Mar	Apr	May	Jun	Jul	Aug	Sep	Oct	Nov	Dec	Year
Record high °C (°F)	14.3 (57.7)	20.0 (68.0)	30.0 (86.0)	32.4 (90.3)	37.1 (98.8)	40.8 (105.4)	41.0 (105.8)	36.6 (97.9)	34.9 (94.8)	31.6 (88.9)	22.7 (72.9)	15.0 (59.0)	41.0 (105.8)
Mean daily maximum °C (°F)	2.2 (36.0)	6.3 (43.3)	13.5 (56.3)	21.0 (69.8)	26.9 (80.4)	31.0 (87.8)	31.7 (89.1)	30.2 (86.4)	26.5 (79.7)	19.5 (67.1)	10.2 (50.4)	3.6 (38.5)	18.5 (65.4)
Daily mean °C (°F)	−4.2 (24.4)	−0.2 (31.6)	7.1 (44.8)	14.7 (58.5)	20.7 (69.3)	25.1 (77.2)	26.8 (80.2)	25.3 (77.5)	20.2 (68.4)	12.9 (55.2)	4.2 (39.6)	−2.4 (27.7)	12.5 (54.5)
Mean daily minimum °C (°F)	−9.2 (15.4)	−5.4 (22.3)	1.1 (34.0)	8.2 (46.8)	14.2 (57.6)	19.3 (66.7)	22.5 (72.5)	21.0 (69.8)	14.9 (58.8)	7.6 (45.7)	−0.5 (31.1)	−6.8 (19.8)	7.2 (45.0)
Record low °C (°F)	−23.3 (−9.9)	−18.4 (−1.1)	−11.0 (12.2)	−3.8 (25.2)	3.6 (38.5)	10.2 (50.4)	16.0 (60.8)	13.8 (56.8)	3.8 (38.8)	−4.8 (23.4)	−11.5 (11.3)	−19.0 (−2.2)	−23.3 (−9.9)
Average precipitation mm (inches)	2.1 (0.08)	5.2 (0.20)	7.8 (0.31)	23.9 (0.94)	34.3 (1.35)	65.0 (2.56)	170.6 (6.72)	111.6 (4.39)	49.0 (1.93)	25.6 (1.01)	12.1 (0.48)	2.2 (0.09)	509.4 (20.06)
Average precipitation days (≥ 0.1 mm)	1.8	2.1	2.7	4.7	6.1	8.8	12.1	10.5	7.3	5.5	3.0	1.5	66.1
Average snowy days	2.9	2.2	1.2	0.1	0	0	0	0	0	0	1.7	2.4	10.5
Average relative humidity (%)	58	52	47	51	56	62	74	79	75	69	67	62	63
Mean monthly sunshine hours	157.4	162.4	206.7	222.5	245.9	206.1	174.7	184.4	187.5	179.3	150.9	152.7	2,230.5
Percentage possible sunshine	52	53	55	56	55	46	39	44	51	53	51	53	51
Source: China Meteorological Administration

== Transportation ==
- Jingguang railway: Gaobeidian Railway Station
- Beijing–Shijiazhuang high-speed railway: Gaobeidian East railway station
- Jingshi Expressway
- Jingkun Expressway
- China National Highway 107

== Architecture and environment ==
Gaobeidian is known for its leadership in energy efficient building, and hosted the 23rd International Passive House Conference in 2019. The Gaobeidian Railway City apartment complex is the world's largest passive house project. Companies that were involved in the development of the project include Hebei Orient Sundar Group.

== See also ==
- Kaishan Temple
