= List of State of the Nation Addresses (Philippines) =

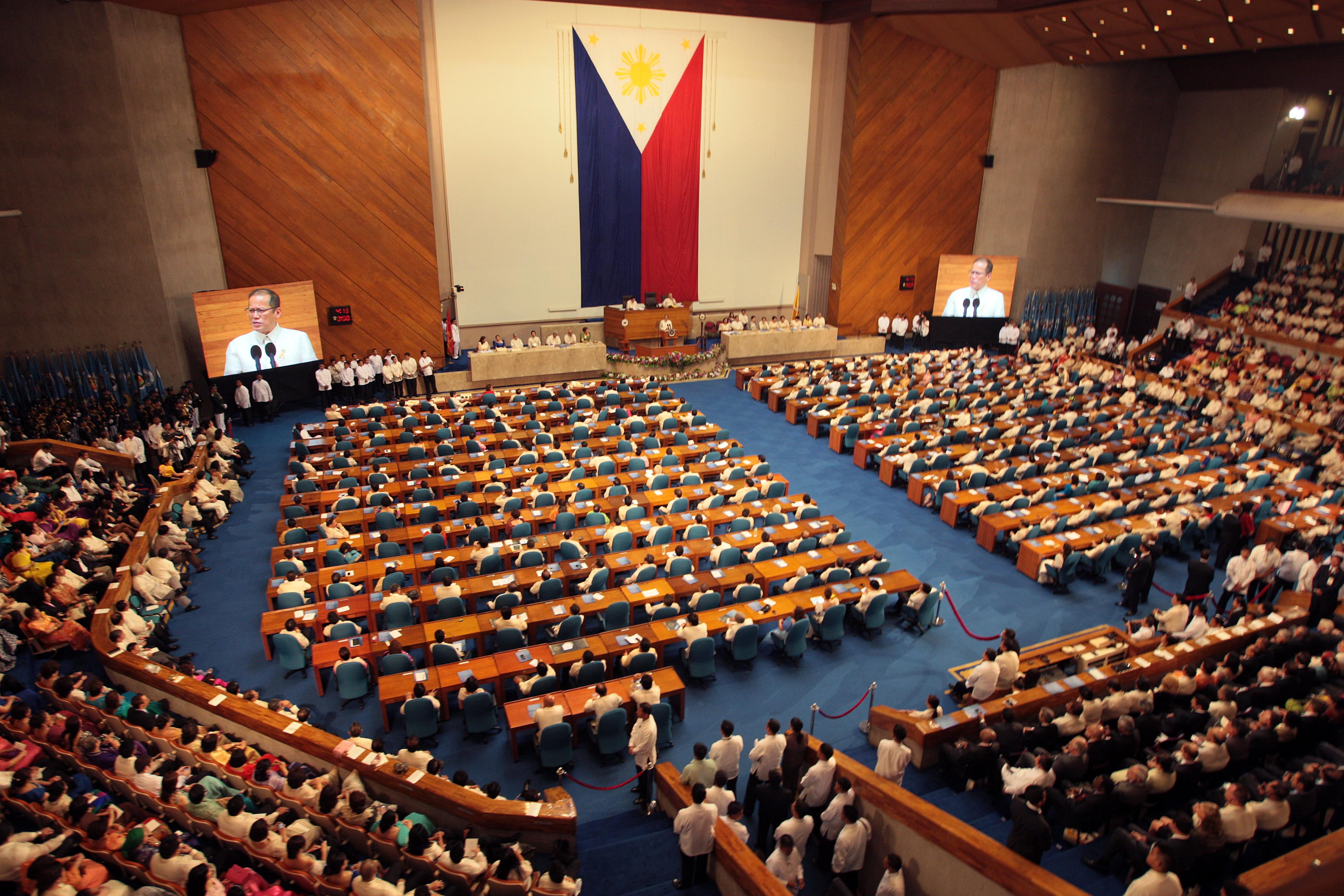
President Benigno Aquino III delivering his second State of the Nation Address at the Plenary Hall of the Batasang Pambansa Complex on July 25, 2011

Since 1935, the presidents of the Philippines have delivered 88 annual State of the Nation Addresses (SONAs).

== History ==
Prior to the introduction of the SONA, Emilio Aguinaldo, officially recognized as the first president of the Philippines, held a State of the Revolutionary Nation Address on September 15, 1898, after opening the Malolos Congress entitled Mensaje Leido por el Presidente del Govierno Revolucionario para el Congreso. On June 16, 1936, Manuel L. Quezon held a State of the Commonwealth Government Affairs at the inaugural session of the National Assembly.

The first SONA was made by Manuel L. Quezon in 1935 before the National Assembly. Among those who made a SONA, Ferdinand Marcos made twenty SONAs—the largest number made by a single president. Sergio Osmeña in contrast made just one. Among the officially recognized presidents two presidents did not make a single SONA—Emilio Aguinaldo and José P. Laurel. Marcos was the only one who did not deliver a SONA before the Congress (1973, 1974, 1975, 1976, and 1977). Elpidio Quirino's 1950 speech was delivered through radio broadcast when he was confined at the Johns Hopkins Hospital in Baltimore, Maryland in the United States.

The SONA is traditionally held annually. The presidential speech has been delivered in English until 2009 when it was last delivered in the said language. Benigno Aquino III was the first president to deliver the presidential speech in Filipino. He used Filipino in all of his six speeches from 2010 to 2015.

The longest speech was made by Ferdinand Marcos in 1969, with a total of 29,335 words. In contrast, Gloria Macapagal Arroyo's speech made in 2005 was the shortest, with only 1,551 words.

== List of State of the Nation Addresses ==
No.	President	Date	Title	Venue	Legislature	Session	Language	Duration (in hours and minutes)	Notes
1	Manuel L. Quezon	November 25, 1935	Message to the First Assembly on National Defense	Legislative Building, Manila	1st National Assembly	1st	English		
2	Manuel L. Quezon	June 16, 1936	On the Country’s Conditions and Problems	Legislative Building, Manila	1st National Assembly	1st	English		
3	Manuel L. Quezon	October 18, 1937	Improvement of Philippine Conditions, Philippine Independence, and Relations with American High Commissioner	Legislative Building, Manila	1st National Assembly	2nd	English		
4	Manuel L. Quezon	January 24, 1938	Revision of the System of Taxation	Legislative Building, Manila	1st National Assembly	3rd	English		
5	Manuel L. Quezon	January 24, 1939	The State of the Nation and Important Economic Problems	Legislative Building, Manila	2nd National Assembly	1st	English		
6	Manuel L. Quezon	January 22, 1940	The State of the Nation	Legislative Building, Manila	2nd National Assembly	2nd	English		
7	Manuel L. Quezon	January 31, 1941	The State of the Nation	Legislative Building, Manila	2nd National Assembly	3rd	English		
8	Sergio Osmeña	June 9, 1945	Message to the First Congress of the Commonwealth of Philippines	Lepanto Street, Manila	1st Congress of the Commonwealth	—N/a	English		
9	Manuel Roxas	June 3, 1946	The State of the Nation	Lepanto Street, Manila	2nd Congress of the Commonwealth	—N/a	English		
10	Manuel Roxas	January 27, 1947	Message on the State of the Nation	Lepanto Street, Manila	1st Congress	1st	English		
11	Manuel Roxas	January 26, 1948	The Nation on the Road to Prosperity	Lepanto Street, Manila	1st Congress	2nd	English		
12	Elpidio Quirino	January 24, 1949	The Most Urgent Aim of the Administration	Legislative Building, Manila	1st Congress	3rd	English		
13	Elpidio Quirino	January 23, 1950	Address on the State of the Nation	Baltimore, Maryland; United States	2nd Congress	1st	English		Quirino delivered his address via radio broadcast while he was confined at Johns Hopkins Hospital in Maryland in the United States.
14	Elpidio Quirino	January 23, 1951	The State of the Nation	Legislative Building, Manila	2nd Congress	2nd	English		
15	Elpidio Quirino	January 28, 1952	The State of the Nation	Legislative Building, Manila	2nd Congress	3rd	English		
16	Elpidio Quirino	January 26, 1953	The State of the Nation	Legislative Building, Manila	2nd Congress	4th	English		
17	Ramon Magsaysay	January 25, 1954	Address on the State of the Nation	Legislative Building, Manila	3rd Congress	1st	English		
18	Ramon Magsaysay	January 24, 1955	Address on the State of the Nation	Legislative Building, Manila	3rd Congress	2nd	English		
19	Ramon Magsaysay	January 23, 1956	Address on the State of the Nation	Legislative Building, Manila	3rd Congress	3rd	English		
20	Ramon Magsaysay	January 28, 1957	Address on the State of the Nation	Legislative Building, Manila	3rd Congress	4th	English		
21	Carlos P. Garcia	January 27, 1958	Address on the State of the Nation	Legislative Building, Manila	4th Congress	1st	English		
22	Carlos P. Garcia	January 26, 1959	Address on the State of the Nation	Legislative Building, Manila	4th Congress	2nd	English		
23	Carlos P. Garcia	January 25, 1960	Address on the State of the Nation	Legislative Building, Manila	4th Congress	3rd	English		
24	Carlos P. Garcia	January 23, 1961	Address on the State of the Nation	Legislative Building, Manila	4th Congress	4th	English		
25	Diosdado Macapagal	January 22, 1962	Five-Year Integrated Socio-Economic Program for the Philippines	Legislative Building, Manila	5th Congress	1st	English		
26	Diosdado Macapagal	January 28, 1963	The State of the Nation 1963	Legislative Building, Manila	5th Congress	2nd	English		
27	Diosdado Macapagal	January 27, 1964	The State of the Nation	Legislative Building, Manila	5th Congress	3rd	English		
28	Diosdado Macapagal	January 25, 1965	The Philippines after Three Years (1962–1965)	Legislative Building, Manila	5th Congress	4th	English		
29	Ferdinand Marcos	January 24, 1966	Address on the State of the Nation	Legislative Building, Manila	6th Congress	1st	English		
30	Ferdinand Marcos	January 23, 1967	The Epic of Nation-Building	Legislative Building, Manila	6th Congress	2nd	English		
31	Ferdinand Marcos	January 22, 1968	A Nation of Achievers	Legislative Building, Manila	6th Congress	3rd	English		
32	Ferdinand Marcos	January 27, 1969	New Filipinism: The Turning Point	Legislative Building, Manila	6th Congress	4th	English	5-8:30~	
33	Ferdinand Marcos	January 26, 1970	National Discipline: The Key to Our Future	Legislative Building, Manila	7th Congress	1st	English		Led to the First Quarter Storm
34	Ferdinand Marcos	January 25, 1971	The Democratic Revolution	Legislative Building, Manila	7th Congress	2nd	English		
35	Ferdinand Marcos	January 24, 1972	Strength through Crisis, Growth in Freedom	Legislative Building, Manila	7th Congress	3rd	English		
36	Ferdinand Marcos	September 21, 1973	Report to the Nation after One Year of Martial Law	Malacañan Palace, Manila	—N/a		English		
37	Ferdinand Marcos	September 21, 1974	The Barangay and the Imperative of National Unity	Maharlika Hall; Malacañan Palace, Manila	—N/a		English		
38	Ferdinand Marcos	September 19, 1975	The President’s Report to the Nation	Quirino Grandstand, Manila	—N/a		English		
39	Ferdinand Marcos	September 21, 1976	We Stand Proud as a Nation Today	Philippine International Convention Center, Pasay	Batasang Bayan	—N/a	English		
40	Ferdinand Marcos	September 21, 1977	The Years of Crisis Government: Review and Preview	Luneta Park, Manila	—N/a		English		
41	Ferdinand Marcos	June 12, 1978	A Bold Experiment	Batasang Pambansa, Quezon City	Interim Batasang Pambansa	—N/a	English		
42	Ferdinand Marcos	July 23, 1979	The State of the Nation	Batasang Pambansa, Quezon City	Interim Batasang Pambansa	—N/a	English		
43	Ferdinand Marcos	July 28, 1980	A Time of Challenge to the Nation	Batasang Pambansa, Quezon City	Interim Batasang Pambansa	—N/a	English		
44	Ferdinand Marcos	July 27, 1981	State-of-the-Nation Address	Batasang Pambansa, Quezon City	Interim Batasang Pambansa	—N/a	English		
45	Ferdinand Marcos	July 26, 1982	State-of-the-Nation Address	Batasang Pambansa, Quezon City	Interim Batasang Pambansa	—N/a	English		
46	Ferdinand Marcos	January 17, 1983	State-of-the-Nation Address	Batasang Pambansa, Quezon City	Interim Batasang Pambansa	—N/a	English		
47	Ferdinand Marcos	July 23, 1984	State-of-the-Nation Address	Batasang Pambansa, Quezon City	Regular Pambansang Pambansa	—N/a	English		
48	Ferdinand Marcos	July 22, 1985	A Turning Point for the Nation	Batasang Pambansa, Quezon City	Regular Pambansang Pambansa	—N/a	English		
49	Corazon Aquino	July 27, 1987	State of the Nation	Batasang Pambansa, Quezon City	8th Congress	1st	English	0:38	
50	Corazon Aquino	July 25, 1988	State of the Nation	Batasang Pambansa, Quezon City	8th Congress	2nd	English		
51	Corazon Aquino	July 24, 1989	The State of the Nation	Batasang Pambansa, Quezon City	8th Congress	3rd	English		
52	Corazon Aquino	July 23, 1990	The State of the Nation	Batasang Pambansa, Quezon City	8th Congress	4th	English		
53	Corazon Aquino	July 22, 1991	The State of the Nation	Batasang Pambansa, Quezon City	8th Congress	5th	English		
54	Fidel V. Ramos	July 27, 1992	Reform, Change, and Growth	Batasang Pambansa, Quezon City	9th Congress	1st	English		
55	Fidel V. Ramos	July 26, 1993	Let’s Seize the Moment!	Batasang Pambansa, Quezon City	9th Congress	2nd	English		
56	Fidel V. Ramos	July 25, 1994	From Growth to Modernization	Batasang Pambansa, Quezon City	9th Congress	3rd	English		
57	Fidel V. Ramos	July 24, 1995	The Best Is Soon to Come	Batasang Pambansa, Quezon City	10th Congress	1st	English		
58	Fidel V. Ramos	July 22, 1996	Uniting for Peace and Development	Batasang Pambansa, Quezon City	10th Congress	2nd	English		
59	Fidel V. Ramos	July 28, 1997	The Challenges Still Ahead	Batasang Pambansa, Quezon City	10th Congress	3rd	English		
60	Joseph Estrada	July 27, 1998	The State of the Nation	Batasang Pambansa, Quezon City	11th Congress	1st	English		
61	Joseph Estrada	July 26, 1999	A Poverty-Free Philippines	Batasang Pambansa, Quezon City	11th Congress	2nd	English		
62	Joseph Estrada	July 24, 2000	Toward New Beginnings	Batasang Pambansa, Quezon City	11th Congress	3rd	English		
63	Gloria Macapagal Arroyo	July 23, 2001	First State of the Nation Address	Batasang Pambansa, Quezon City	12th Congress	1st	English	1:06	
64	Gloria Macapagal Arroyo	July 22, 2002	State of the Nation Address	Batasang Pambansa, Quezon City	12th Congress	2nd	English		
65	Gloria Macapagal Arroyo	July 28, 2003	State of the Nation Address	Batasang Pambansa, Quezon City	12th Congress	3rd	English		
66	Gloria Macapagal Arroyo	July 26, 2004	Fourth State of the Nation Address	Batasang Pambansa, Quezon City	13th Congress	1st	English		
67	Gloria Macapagal Arroyo	July 25, 2005	Fifth State of the Nation Address	Batasang Pambansa, Quezon City	13th Congress	2nd	English	0:23	
68	Gloria Macapagal Arroyo	July 24, 2006	Sixth State of the Nation Address	Batasang Pambansa, Quezon City	13th Congress	3rd	English		
69	Gloria Macapagal Arroyo	July 23, 2007	Seventh State of the Nation Address	Batasang Pambansa, Quezon City	14th Congress	1st	English		
70	Gloria Macapagal Arroyo	July 28, 2008	Eighth State of the Nation Address	Batasang Pambansa, Quezon City	14th Congress	2nd	English		
71	Gloria Macapagal Arroyo	July 27, 2009	Ninth State of the Nation Address	Batasang Pambansa, Quezon City	14th Congress	3rd	English		
72	Benigno Aquino III	July 26, 2010	State of the Nation Address	Batasang Pambansa, Quezon City	15th Congress	1st	Filipino	0:40	Aquino was the first president to use Filipino and a language other than English at the SONA.
73	Benigno Aquino III	July 25, 2011	State of the Nation Address	Batasang Pambansa, Quezon City	15th Congress	2nd	Filipino	0:53	
74	Benigno Aquino III	July 23, 2012	Third State of the Nation Address	Batasang Pambansa, Quezon City	15th Congress	3rd	Filipino	1:27	
75	Benigno Aquino III	July 22, 2013	Fourth State of the Nation Address	Batasang Pambansa, Quezon City	16th Congress	1st	Filipino	1:44	
76	Benigno Aquino III	July 28, 2014	Fifth State of the Nation Address	Batasang Pambansa, Quezon City	16th Congress	2nd	Filipino	1:31	
77	Benigno Aquino III	July 27, 2015	Sixth State of the Nation Address	Batasang Pambansa, Quezon City	16th Congress	3rd	Filipino	2:13	
78	Rodrigo Duterte	July 25, 2016	First State of the Nation Address	Batasang Pambansa, Quezon City	17th Congress	1st	English, Filipino	1:33	
79	Rodrigo Duterte	July 24, 2017	Second State of the Nation Address	Batasang Pambansa, Quezon City	17th Congress	2nd	English, Filipino	2:00	
80	Rodrigo Duterte	July 23, 2018	Third State of the Nation Address	Batasang Pambansa, Quezon City	17th Congress	3rd	English, Filipino	0:48	
81	Rodrigo Duterte	July 22, 2019	Fourth State of the Nation Address	Batasang Pambansa, Quezon City	18th Congress	1st	English, Filipino	1:33	
82	Rodrigo Duterte	July 27, 2020	Fifth State of the Nation Address	Batasang Pambansa, Quezon City	18th Congress	2nd	English, Filipino	1:41	
83	Rodrigo Duterte	July 26, 2021	Sixth State of the Nation Address	Batasang Pambansa, Quezon City	18th Congress	3rd	English, Filipino	2:39	
84	Bongbong Marcos	July 25, 2022	First State of the Nation Address	Batasang Pambansa, Quezon City	19th Congress	1st	English, Filipino	1:14	
85	Bongbong Marcos	July 24, 2023	Second State of the Nation Address	Batasang Pambansa, Quezon City	19th Congress	2nd	English, Filipino	1:11	
86	Bongbong Marcos	July 22, 2024	Third State of the Nation Address	Batasang Pambansa, Quezon City	19th Congress	3rd	English, Filipino	1:22	
87	Bongbong Marcos	July 28, 2025	Fourth State of the Nation Address	Batasang Pambansa, Quezon City	20th Congress	1st	English, Filipino	1:10	
88	Bongbong Marcos	July 27, 2026	Fifth State of the Nation Address	Batasang Pambansa, Quezon City	20th Congress	2nd	English, Filipino	1:25	
