= 2014 State of the Nation Address (Philippines) =

Fifth State of the Nation Address of President Benigno Aquino III
- Full video of the speech as published by Radio Television Malacañang
- Date: July 28, 2014
- Duration: 1 hour and 35 minutes
- Venue: Session Hall, Batasang Pambansa Complex
- Location: Quezon City, Philippines; 14°41′36″N 121°5′40″E
- Filmed by: Radio Television Malacañang
- Participants: Benigno Aquino III; Franklin Drilon; Feliciano Belmonte Jr.
- Languages: Filipino
- Previous: 2013 State of the Nation Address
- Next: 2015 State of the Nation Address

The 2014 State of the Nation Address was the fifth State of the Nation Address (SONA) delivered by Benigno Aquino III, the 15th president of the Philippines, on July 28, 2014, at the Batasang Pambansa Complex.

== Preparations and guests ==
Four Philippine National Police task forces under the banner of 'Super Task Force Kapayapaan' was deployed, consisting of 10,000 cops. Vice President Jejomar Binay attended the address. Senators Juan Ponce Enrile, Bong Revilla, and Jinggoy Estrada were detained, resulting in their loss of attendance. Senator Miriam Defensor Santiago didn't attend because of her lung cancer. Representative Lani Mercado said that she wouldn't attend so that she could boycott the address.

== Address ==
The speech addressed major issues and programs at the time. Aquino discussed the Technical Education and Skills Development Authority's Training-for-Work Scholarship Program, the Expanded Conditional Cash Transfer Program, projects made by the government, and other topics.

== Reception ==
The Rappler mood meter for SONA 2014 highlighted that the angriness votes for the 2014 edition were three times of the votes in the previous edition. According to then-former congressman Teodoro Locsin Jr., it was the best SONA he attended. Then-Vice President Jejomar Binay and Senator Grace Poe noticed the lack of information over the Freedom of Information (FOI) bill. Multiple sectors also noticed the non-mention of the FOI bill. Senators Bong Revilla and Jinggoy Estrada praised the address.

== Protests ==
Thousands rallied in Tandang Sora Avenue and Commonwealth Avenue while some groups rallied near the Batasang Pambansang Complex, where the address was held. According to former Kabataan representative Raymond Palatino, Filipinos had more cause to be angry to Aquino for government response to Typhoon Haiyan and other issues. 7,500 protesters rallied in Iloilo, 7,000 rallied in Capiz, 2,000 rallied in Aklan, 1,000 rallied in Bacolod, and 500 rallied in Cebu.

Preceded by 2013 State of the Nation Address	State of the Nation Address; 2014	Succeeded by 2015 State of the Nation Address
