= 2025 State of the Nation Address (Philippines) =

State of the Nation Address of the Philippines

Fourth State of the Nation Address of President Bongbong Marcos
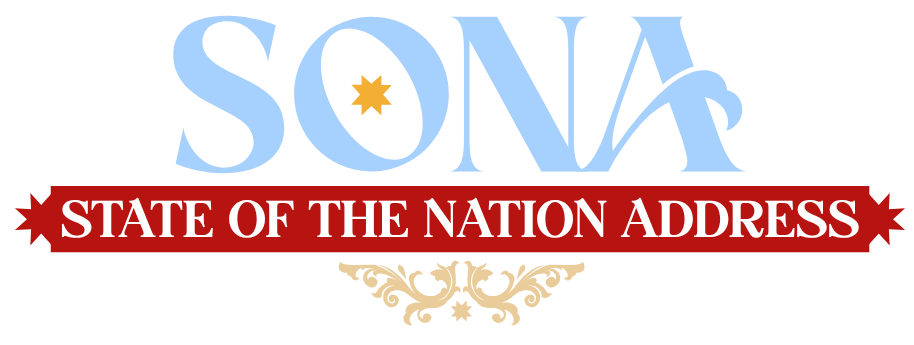
- Official SONA 2025 logo
- Full video of the speech as published by Radio Television Malacañang
- Date: July 28, 2025
- Duration: 1 hour and 11 minutes
- Venue: Session Hall, Batasang Pambansa Complex
- Location: Quezon City, Philippines; 14°41′36″N 121°5′40″E
- Filmed by: Radio Television Malacañang
- Participants: Bongbong Marcos; Francis Escudero; Martin Romualdez
- Languages: English, Filipino
- Previous: 2024 State of the Nation Address
- Next: 2026 State of the Nation Address
- Website: stateofthenation.gov.ph/sona/2025/ sona2025.econgress.gov.ph

The 2025 State of the Nation Address was the fourth State of the Nation Address (SONA) delivered by Bongbong Marcos, the 17th president of the Philippines, on July 28, 2025, at the Batasang Pambansa Complex.

Marcos' statements on the issue of substandard flood control projects has since been credited with foregrounding the infrastructure corruption scandal that arose in later weeks.

== Preparations ==
House of Representatives Sergeant-at-Arms, retired PMGen. Napoleon Taas, reported during an inter-agency coordination meeting that an estimated 27,000 security and response personnel will be deployed to secure the Batasan Complex.

It is the last SONA at which Senate President Francis Escudero and House Speaker Martin Romualdez are expected to preside on the part of the Senate and the House of Representatives, respectively.

== Guests ==
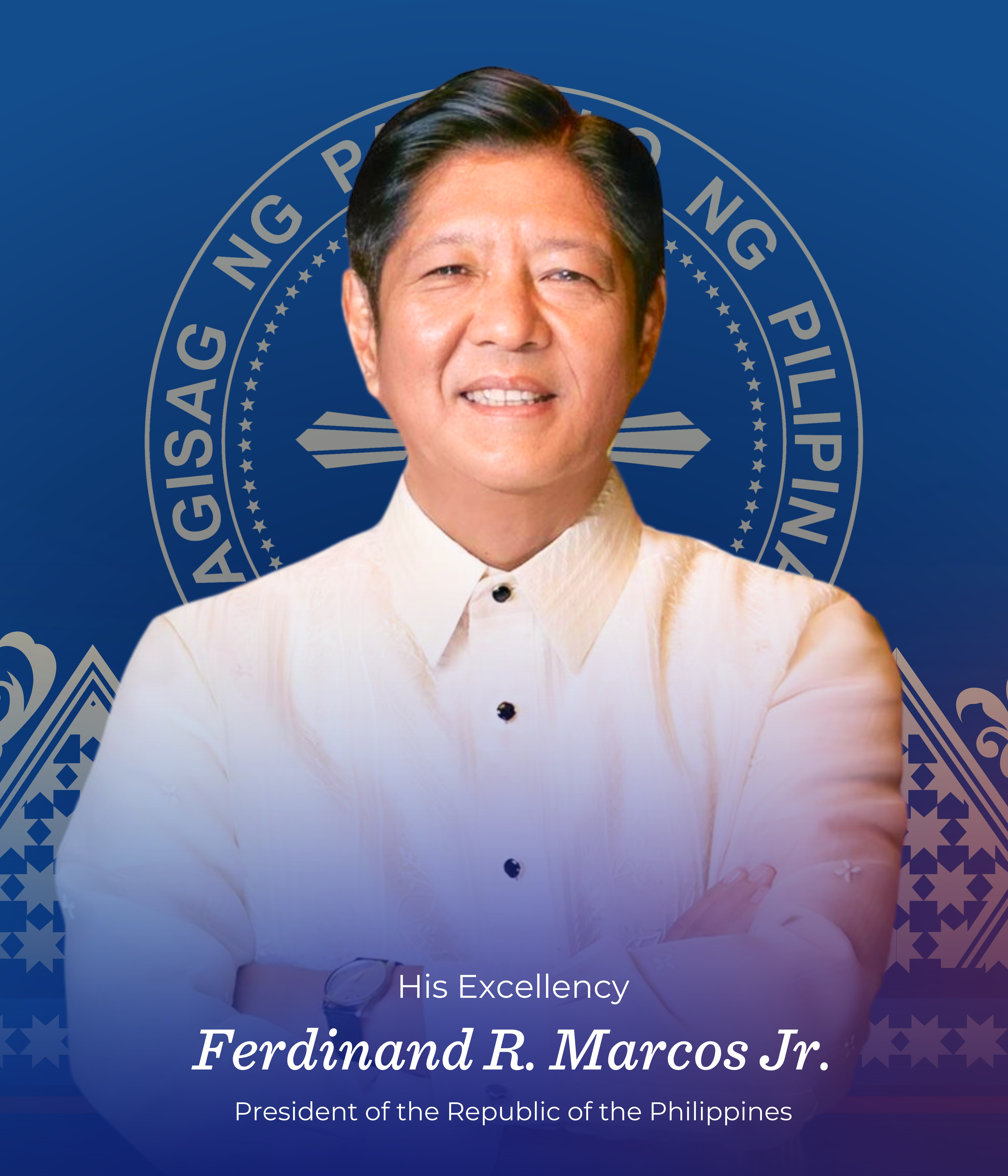
Marcos's 2025 SONA portrait

As with the previous year's SONA, Vice President Sara Duterte declined the House of Representatives' invitation to attend the address. Initially, no explanation was provided for her absence, although it is notable that an impeachment case was filed by the House of Representatives against the Vice President in February. Duterte later said that she did not believe President Marcos would provide "anything substantial" about the country. Former President Rodrigo Duterte, currently detained at The Hague and awaiting trial before the International Criminal Court following his arrest in March 2025, was also sent an invitation, according to House Secretary General Reginald Velasco. In addition, Duterte-allied Senators Ronald Dela Rosa, Bong Go, Robin Padilla, and Imee Marcos, who is President Marcos's sister, opted to physically skip the SONA.

== Address ==
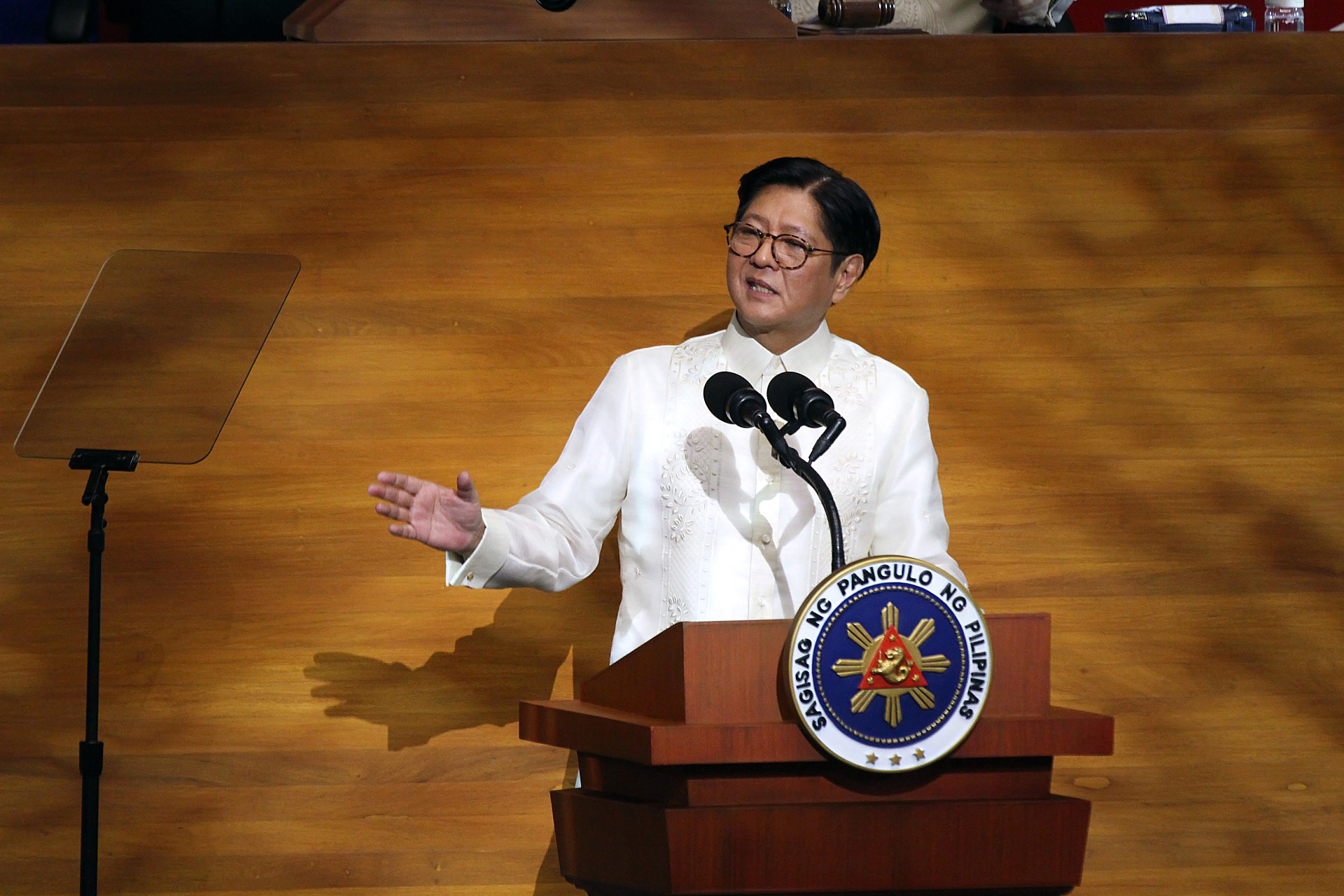
The speech

Before President Bongbong Marcos started his speech, the singing of "Lupang Hinirang" by Sofronio Vasquez (season 26 winner of The Voice) was held. It was followed by the ecumenical prayer led by representatives of various religious groups. Afterwards, Marcos outlined his administration's accomplishments while addressing specific issues such as anomalous flood control projects, Filipino sailors who were caught up in the Red Sea crisis, electricity outage in Siquijor, the collapse of the Cabagan–Santa Maria Bridge, and the 2021–2022 Luzon sabungero disappearances. Marcos drew widespread attention for his remark "mahiya naman kayo" (transl. "have some shame"), referring to lawmakers and businessmen involved in the flood control projects scandal. Several contractors, government officials, and current and former legislators have since been charged and detained. He also told Congress that he would not sign the 2026 budget if it was not aligned with the government's spending program, even if it meant operating on a reenacted budget. Marcos' speech began at 4:06 p.m. and ended at 5:17 p.m, both times PHT, lasting for 1 hour and 11 minutes; the speech was delivered mostly in Filipino, with some parts in English.

== Protests ==
The People's SONA, a protest led by the opposition alliance Bagong Alyansang Makabayan, was held at St. Peter's Church along Commonwealth Avenue in Quezon City. Between 4,000 to 10,000 people attended the demonstration, along with other political parties and alliances including Sanlakas, Bunyong Party, ATOM, and others. Protests were also held overseas by BAYAN USA in New York City, Chicago, Seattle, Portland, Los Angeles, San Francisco, and Washington DC. The People's SONA sought to highlight rising hunger, poverty, unemployment, and inflation while calling on the government to address these issues.

== Aftermath ==
Following a directive from Marcos during his address to promote active lifestyles among Filipinos, the Philippine Sports Commission opened its track and field facilities in Manila, Pasig, and Baguio for free to the public beginning on July 29.

Preceded by 2024 State of the Nation Address	State of the Nation Address; 2025	Succeeded by 2026 State of the Nation Address
