= 1935 State of the Nation Address (Philippines) =

State of the Nation Address of the Philippines

1935 Message to the First Assembly on National Defense
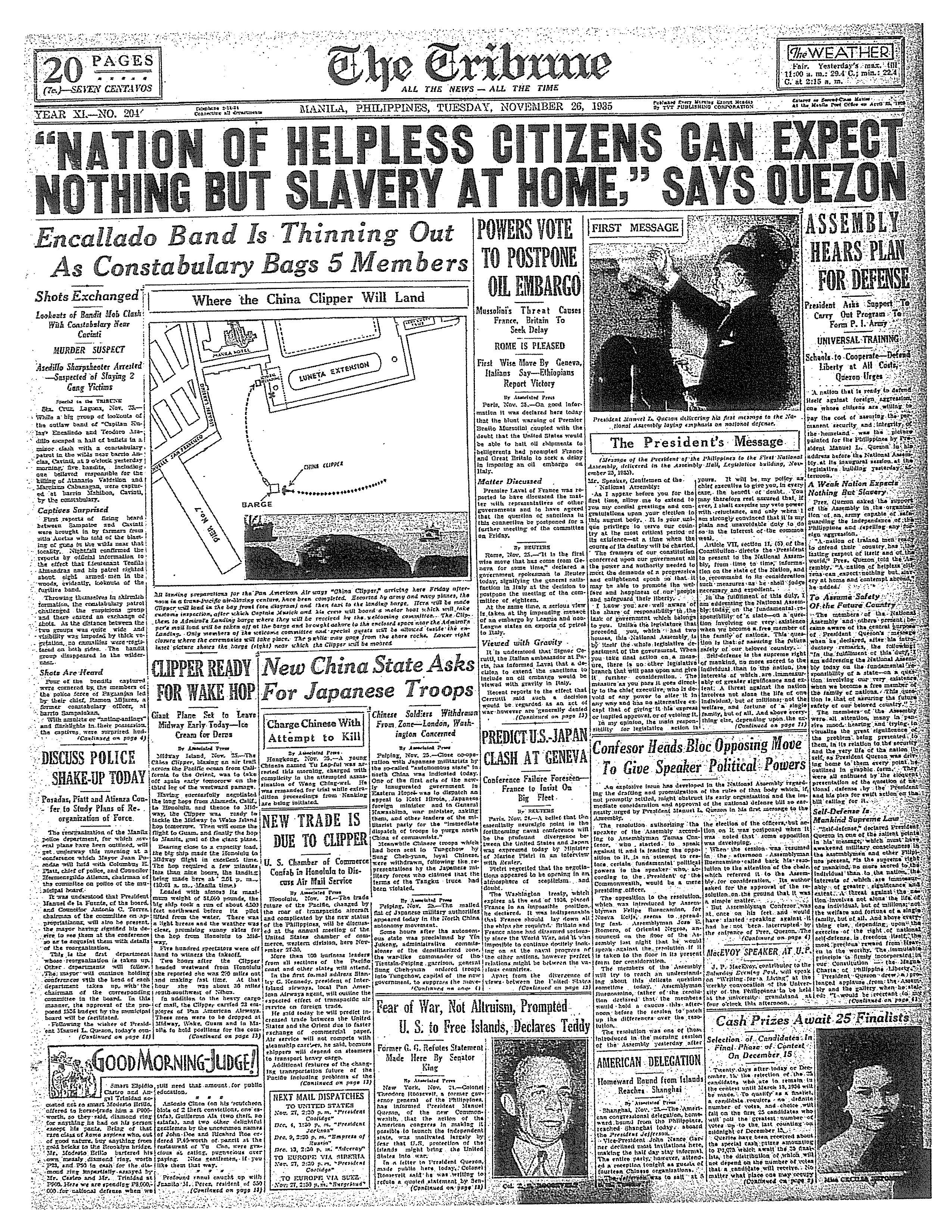
- Front page of the November 26, 1935 issue of The Tribune, featuring President Manuel L. Quezon's first State of the Nation Address to the National Assembly.
- Date: November 25, 1935
- Venue: Assembly Hall, Legislative Building
- Location: Manila, Philippines; 14°35′13″N 120°58′52″E
- Participants: Manuel L. Quezon; Gil Montilla
- Languages: English
- Next: 1936 State of the Nation Address

The 1935 Message to the First Assembly on National Defense was the first State of the Nation Address (SONA) in Philippine history. It was delivered by Manuel L. Quezon, the 2nd president of the Philippines, on November 25, 1935, at the Legislative Building (now the National Museum of Fine Arts).

The session was presided over by National Assembly speaker Gil Montilla.

Quezon's address focused primarily on national defense and the military preparedness of the newly-established Philippine Commonwealth. He urged the Assembly to enact measures necessary for the creation of a national defense system and emphasized the importance of preparing the country to assume full responsibility for its security upon independence from American rule in 1946.

== See also ==
- 1935 Philippine presidential election

Preceded by None (First SONA delivered)	State of the Nation Address; 1935	Succeeded by 1936 State of the Nation Address
