= 2015 State of the Nation Address (Philippines) =

Speech by Philippine President Benigno Aquino III

Sixth State of the Nation Address of President Benigno Aquino III
- Full video of the speech as published by Radio Television Malacañang
- Date: July 27, 2015
- Duration: 2 hours and 13 minutes
- Venue: Session Hall, Batasang Pambansa
- Location: Quezon City, Philippines; 14°41′36″N 121°5′40″E
- Filmed by: Radio Television Malacañang
- Participants: Benigno Aquino III; Franklin Drilon; Feliciano Belmonte Jr.
- Language: Filipino
- Previous: 2014 State of the Nation Address
- Next: 2016 State of the Nation Address

The 2015 State of the Nation Address was the sixth and last State of the Nation Address (SONA) delivered by Benigno Aquino III, the 15th president of the Philippines, on July 27, 2015, at the Batasang Pambansa Complex.

== Seating and guests ==
Two former president of the Philippines, Joseph Estrada and Fidel Ramos were among the attendees of the SONA.

== Address content and delivery ==
The speech was the longest of State of the Nation Address in recent Philippine history upon its completion at 2 hours and 13 minutes. He discussed the list of priority bills set at least until 2016, attributed his problems to his predecessor, and thanked his cabinet and all other people who assisted him. His policy of "Daang Matuwid" (Straight Path) is also the centerpiece of his speech. He used videos to supplement his speech.

Aquino blamed the issues experienced by the MRT-3 Metro Rail Transit Corporation, the private corporation tasked to managed elevated rail system. According to Aquino, the contract between the government and the company and a series of temporary restraining orders and arbitration was the reason for the lack of improvement of the rail system. He encouraged the much-criticized Department of Transportation and Communication secretary, Jun Abaya and told him not to lose heart over his critics and praised him for his accomplishments. He highlighted the granting of Category One rating from the United States Federal Aviation Agency, which enables local carrier to create flight routes with locations in the United States and the lifting of a ban over local carriers by the European Union to make flights to its member countries.

He called on for the passage of the Bangsamoro Basic Law and an anti-dynasty bill. He obliged critics of the Bangsamoro bill to come up with an alternative.

Aquino thanked his current cabinet, and some former department secretaries which includes Energy Secretary Jericho Petilla and the late Interior Secretary Jesse Robredo. He also thanked his personal secretaries, close-in assistants, stylists and household manager. One of the notable omission was Vice President Jejomar Binay whom he didn't extend gratitude.

== Reactions ==
=== Jejomar Binay ===
In a speech made at the Cavite State University which he brands as the "true State of the Nation Address", Vice President Jejomar Binay elaborated what he thinks the problems the Aquino administration did not address which includes the poverty, unemployment, issues at the MRT, and how certain disasters and incidents are dealt and managed specifically the 2010 Manila hostage crisis, Typhoon Haiyan, 2013 Zamboanga City crisis and the Mamasapano clash. He specifically noted the President's omission of the SAF 44 in Aquino's SONA and criticized Aquino for it.

=== Senators ===
Senator Grace Poe, expressed concern over the lack of mention of the Freedom of Information Bill.

=== Other politicians ===
Davao City Mayor, Rodrigo Duterte and his son Vice Mayor Paolo Duterte expressed disappointment over President Aquino's speech. They urged Aquino to stop blaming the previous administration particularly of Gloria Macapagal Arroyo over issues Aquino is dealing with. Mayor Duterte graded the speech 7 on a scale of 1 to 10 saying that he should have tackled more on solving criminality. Duterte said that the president seemed not to be informed of the drug problem particularly a report of the Manila police that 9 out of 10 of youth is influenced by drugs which he views as a national concern. He described Aquino as a "clean man" but added that he "cannot comment about other people around him (Aquino)."

== Protests by militant groups ==
Bagong Alyansang Makabayan (Bayan) organized protest outside the Batasang Pambansa, the venue of the SONA to protest against the government of Aquino. Bayan secretary general Renato Reyes Jr. estimated that about 20,000 people from various sectors turned up for the protests along Commonwealth Avenue; while police estimated the number of attendees at 5,000. Reportedly injured were 27 civilians and 8 police personnel. Among those injured were two policemen who allegedly tried to spy on the militants hours before the presidential speech. The police said that they will file charges of direct assault and robbery against the militants who reportedly took the cellphones of the security personnels which the security organization views as a violation of Batas Pambansa 880. Two protesters suffered possible fractures, and one was brought to a hospital emergency room for an eye injury.

Quezon City Police District director Chief Superintendent Joel Pagdilao, said the protests were relatively peaceful compared demonstrations at previous SONAs. Pagdilao attributed this to the police force's restraint and maximum tolerance towards the protestors.

Preceded by 2014 State of the Nation Address	State of the Nation Address; 2015	Succeeded by 2016 State of the Nation Address
