= 2021 State of the Nation Address (Philippines) =

Speech by Philippine President Rodrigo Duterte

Sixth State of the Nation Address of President Rodrigo Duterte
- Date: July 26, 2021
- Duration: 2 hours and 39 minutes
- Venue: Session Hall, Batasang Pambansa Complex
- Location: Quezon City, Philippines; 14°41′36″N 121°5′40″E
- Filmed by: Radio Television Malacañang
- Participants: Rodrigo Duterte; Tito Sotto; Lord Allan Velasco
- Languages: English, Filipino
- Previous: 2020 State of the Nation Address
- Next: 2022 State of the Nation Address

The 2021 State of the Nation Address was the sixth and last State of the Nation Address (SONA) delivered by Rodrigo Duterte, the 16th president of the Philippines, on July 26, 2021, at the Batasang Pambansa Complex.

== Preparations ==
Various government agencies held meetings to discuss health protocols due to the still prevailing COVID-19 pandemic to mitigate the potential spread of COVID-19 among attendees of the State of the Nation Address (SONA). Attendees were required to be vaccinated, and undergo a RT-PCR test for COVID-19 two days prior to the speech and submit themselves to a rapid antigen test at the Batasang Pambansa on the day of the SONA itself. Attendees were given the option to attend the SONA virtually through video teleconferencing. 15,000 police officers were deployed to the Batasang Pambansa.

== Seating and guests ==
Due to the COVID-19 pandemic, only 350 people were allowed to physically attend the State of the Nation Address (SONA). Eight senators signified interest to physically attend the SONA. Vice President Leni Robredo attended the SONA virtually.

== Address content and delivery ==
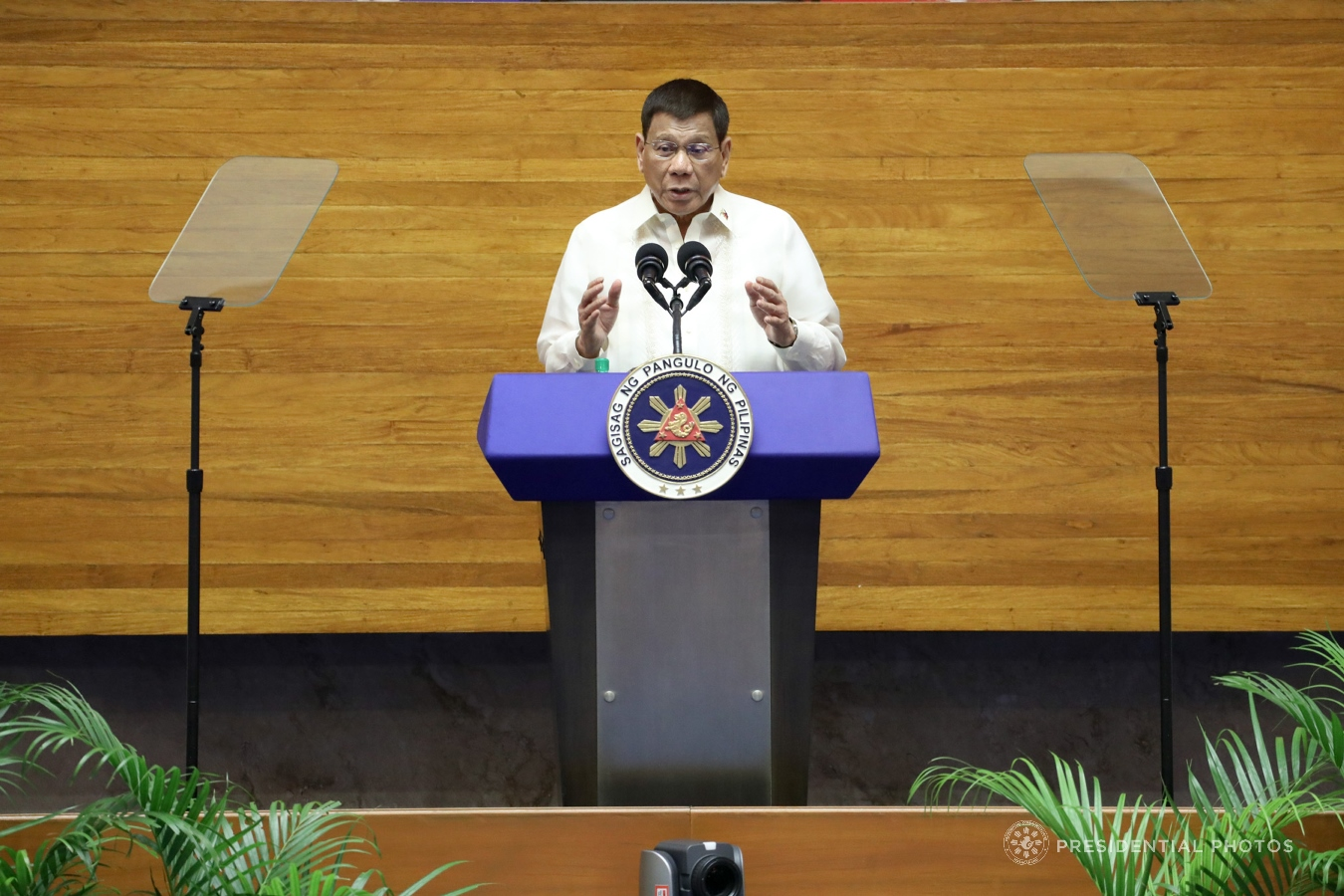
President Rodrigo Duterte delivering his sixth and last State of the Nation Address at the Batasang Pambansa in Quezon City.

President spokesperson Harry Roque said that the president's speech would include information about the social programs, infrastructure projects, peace and security, and foreign policy of the administration. The coverage of the SONA was directed by Danny Abad of Radio Television Malacañang (RTVM). The SONA was exclusively covered by the People's Television Network (PTV) and RTVM; but other broadcasters and social media platforms were allowed to hook PTV and RTVM's live coverage.

Prior to the start of President Rodrigo Duterte's speech, a prayer was conducted which was followed by the singing of "Lupang Hinirang", the national anthem, by Morissette. Duterte's speech started at 4:13pm. He was joined by Senate President Tito Sotto and House Speaker Lord Allan Velasco.

He started with describing his administration's intention as "pure and unpolluted" and characterized the past five years of his presidency as "truly challenging and humbling" before thanking frontliners for the contribution in responding against the COVID-19 pandemic. He also reassured the public that more COVID-19 vaccines are set to arrive but also noted the dangerous nature of the emerging Delta variant asking his audience to "pray for salvation".

Duterte pledged his desire for a program that would provide free legal assistance to personnel of the Armed Forces of the Philippines (AFP) and the Philippine National Police (PNP) as well as a unified system of retirement and pension for the country's security personnel. He also urged Congress to pass a legislation to establish a dedicated agency that would cater to the needs of Overseas Filipino Workers. He also lamented how illegal drugs and corruption remain a national problem.

Duterte mentioned the decongestion of traffic on EDSA, a major thoroughfare in Metro Manila, amidst the community quarantine measure touting that his administration has "taken away misery of public commuting". He also mentioned infrastructure projects his administration has started or completed. Duterte mentioned other actions which he considered as his administration's accomplishments including the extension of the validity of driver's licenses to 10 years, going after water concessionaires, and improvements in the Philippine economy prior to the onset of the pandemic.

The speech was the longest post–People Power Revolution SONA, lasting for 2 hours and 39 minutes.

Preceded by 2020 State of the Nation Address	State of the Nation Address; 2021	Succeeded by 2022 State of the Nation Address
