= 2017 State of the Nation Address (Philippines) =

Speech by Philippine President Rodrigo Duterte

Second State of the Nation Address of President Rodrigo Duterte
- Full video of the speech as published by Radio Television Malacañang
- Date: July 24, 2017
- Duration: 1 hour and 33 minutes
- Venue: Session Hall, Batasang Pambansa Complex
- Location: Quezon City, Philippines; 14°41′36″N 121°5′40″E
- Filmed by: Radio Television Malacañang
- Participants: Rodrigo Duterte; Koko Pimentel; Pantaleon Alvarez
- Language: English
- Previous: 2016 State of the Nation Address
- Next: 2018 State of the Nation Address

The 2017 State of the Nation Address was the second State of the Nation Address (SONA) delivered by Rodrigo Duterte, the 16th president of the Philippines, on July 24, 2017, at the Batasang Pambansa Complex.

== Preparations ==
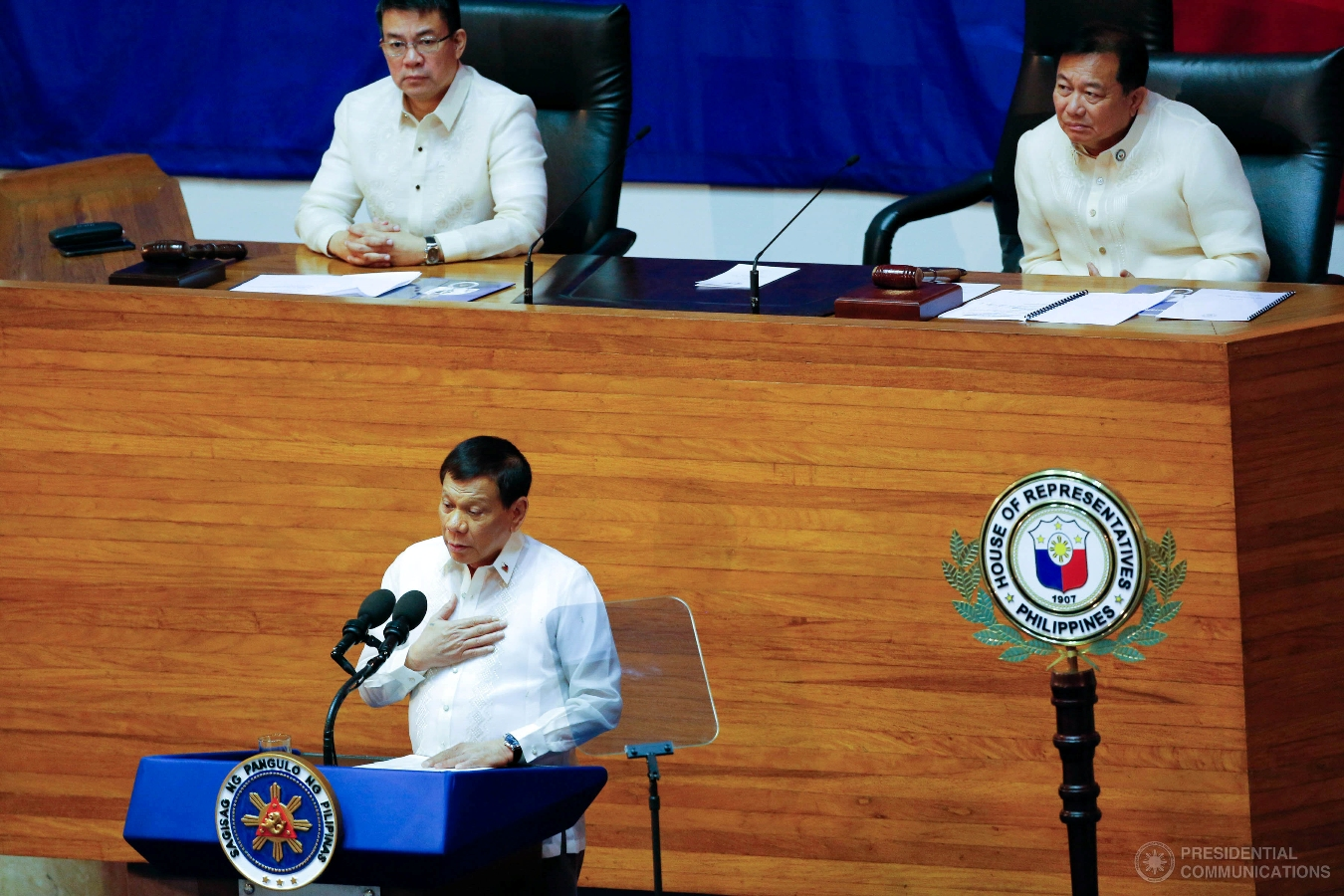
President Rodrigo Duterte delivering his second State of the Nation Address at the Batasang Pambansa in Quezon City.

3000 people were invited to attend the second State of the Nation Address of President Rodrigo Duterte. President Duterte rehearsed his speech and wished to deliver it without the help of a teleprompter.

== Seating and guests ==
Former presidents Fidel V. Ramos, Joseph Estrada, and Gloria Macapagal Arroyo have attended the event. The attendees were invited to wear barongs, Filipiniana dresses, and Mindanao-inspired outfits.

Preceded by 2016 State of the Nation Address	State of the Nation Address; 2017	Succeeded by 2018 State of the Nation Address
