= 2026 State of the Nation Address (Philippines) =

State of the Nation Address of the Philippines

Fifth State of the Nation Address of President Bongbong Marcos
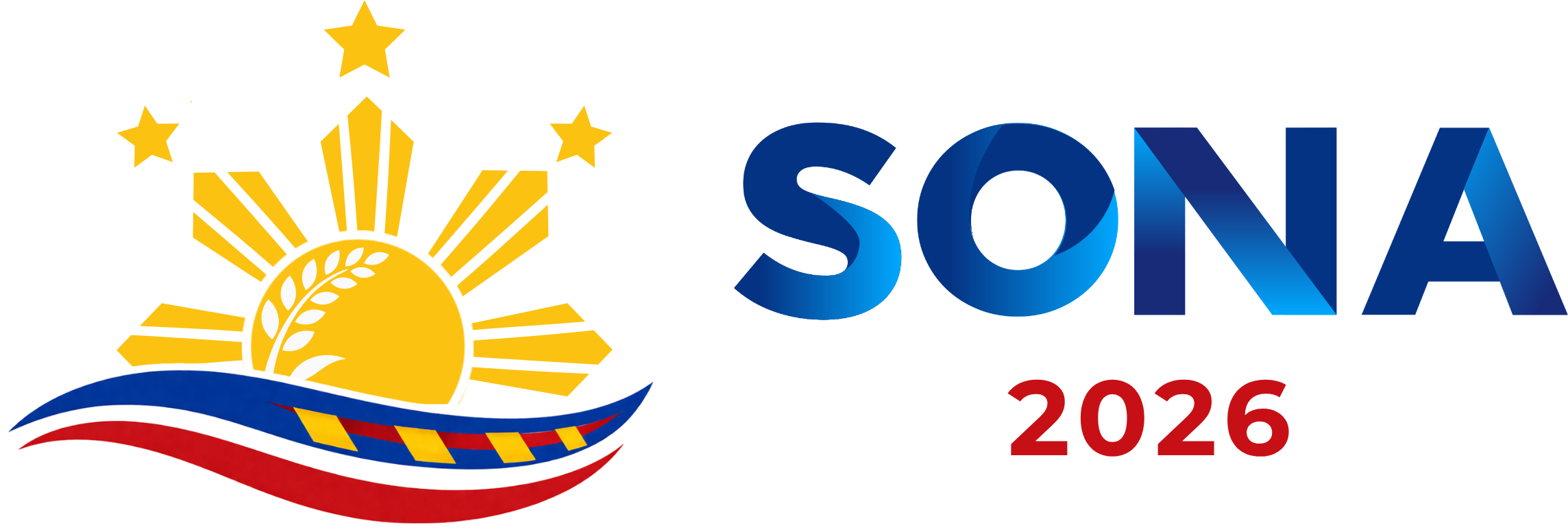
- Official SONA 2026 logo
- Full video of the speech as published by Radio Television Malacañang
- Date: July 27, 2026
- Time: 4:05 p.m. PST
- Duration: 1 hour and 25 minutes
- Venue: Session Hall, Batasang Pambansa Complex
- Location: Quezon City, Philippines; 14°41′36″N 121°5′40″E
- Type: State of the Nation Address
- Filmed by: Radio Television Malacañang
- Participants: Bongbong Marcos; Sherwin Gatchalian; Bojie Dy
- Languages: English, Filipino
- Previous: 2025 State of the Nation Address
- Website: stateofthenation.gov.ph/sona/2026/ sona2026.hrep.online

The 2026 State of the Nation Address was the fifth State of the Nation Address (SONA) by Bongbong Marcos, the 17th president of the Philippines, on July 27, 2026, at the Batasang Pambansa Complex.

The joint session was presided over by Senate President Sherwin Gatchalian and House Speaker Bojie Dy.

== Background ==
Article VII, Section 23 of the 1987 Constitution mandates that the president of the Philippines deliver an annual address to Congress at the opening of its regular session, which is convened every fourth Monday of July.

President Bongbong Marcos's fourth SONA in 2025 drew widespread attention for his remark "mahiya naman kayo" (transl. "have some shame"), referring to lawmakers and businessmen involved in what later became known as the flood control projects scandal. Several contractors, government officials, and current and former legislators have since been charged and detained. (Note: Attributed to multiple sources:)

In February 2026, the House of Representatives expressed its desire for the anti-political dynasty law to be included among the priority measures in the president's address. The measure was passed by the House on third reading on June 3, 2026, during its final session before its sine die adjournment.

On May 11, 2026, the Senate entered a period of political upheaval beginning with the election of Alan Peter Cayetano as Senate president, the resurfacing of Senator Ronald dela Rosa and the subsequent shooting incident in the chamber, and growing discord among senators. The crisis culminated in Cayetano's ouster on June 3 and the assumption by Sherwin Gatchalian of the duties of acting Senate president in his capacity as the newly elected president pro tempore. Gatchalian was formally elected Senate president on June 17 and is expected to preside on the part of the Senate during Marcos's SONA. Marcos earlier stated on June 4 that he would "not tolerate" the Senate's internal rift continuing until the day of the SONA.

== Preparations ==
On June 9, 2026, the first inter-agency coordination meeting for the president's annual address to Congress, headed by the House of Representatives, was convened. House Secretary General Cheloy Garafil stated that the occasion was expected to be simpler, with guests encouraged to refrain from wearing lavish outfits and with no red carpet to be laid out for the arrival of lawmakers and guests, owing to recent events such as the national energy crisis and the 2026 Mindanao earthquake.

Marcos said that he wrote the speech himself and hinted at a "next chapter," paraphrasing the Filipino phrase "abangan ang susunod na kabanata."

=== Incidents ===
On July 27, 2026, hours before the SONA, two improvised explosive devices (IED) were found outside government buildings in Metro Manila, implying coordinated security threats. At approximately 12:17 a.m. PST, an IED detonated outside the Department of Justice (DOJ) Building in Ermita, Manila, causing minor damage but no casualties. At around 8:00 a.m. PST, another IED was discovered 150 meters (490 ft) from the gate of the Senate of the Philippines at GSIS Building, Pasay. Though unexploded, the second IED was successfully neutralized by the Philippine National Police Explosive Ordnance Disposal (PNP-EOD) team.

== Guests ==
Despite remaining invited, Vice President Sara Duterte skipped the SONA for the third consecutive year due to a scheduled overseas trip from July 16 to 31, amidst an ongoing impeachment trial. Thirteen of the 24 senators skipped the SONA for various reasons, including the entire Senate minority bloc with the exception of Camille Villar. Incumbent Representative Gloria Macapagal Arroyo (Pampanga–2nd) was the only living former President in attendance, as Joseph Estrada opted not to attend, while Rodrigo Duterte remains detained at The Hague since his arrest in March 2025.

Other notable guests include:

- Manny Pacquiao, former senator and professional boxer
- Niña Jose-Quiambao, mayor of Bayambang, Pangasinan
- Annette Gozon-Valdes, business executive, lawyer, Senior Vice President of GMA Network
- Yassi Pressman, actress and television personality

== Address ==
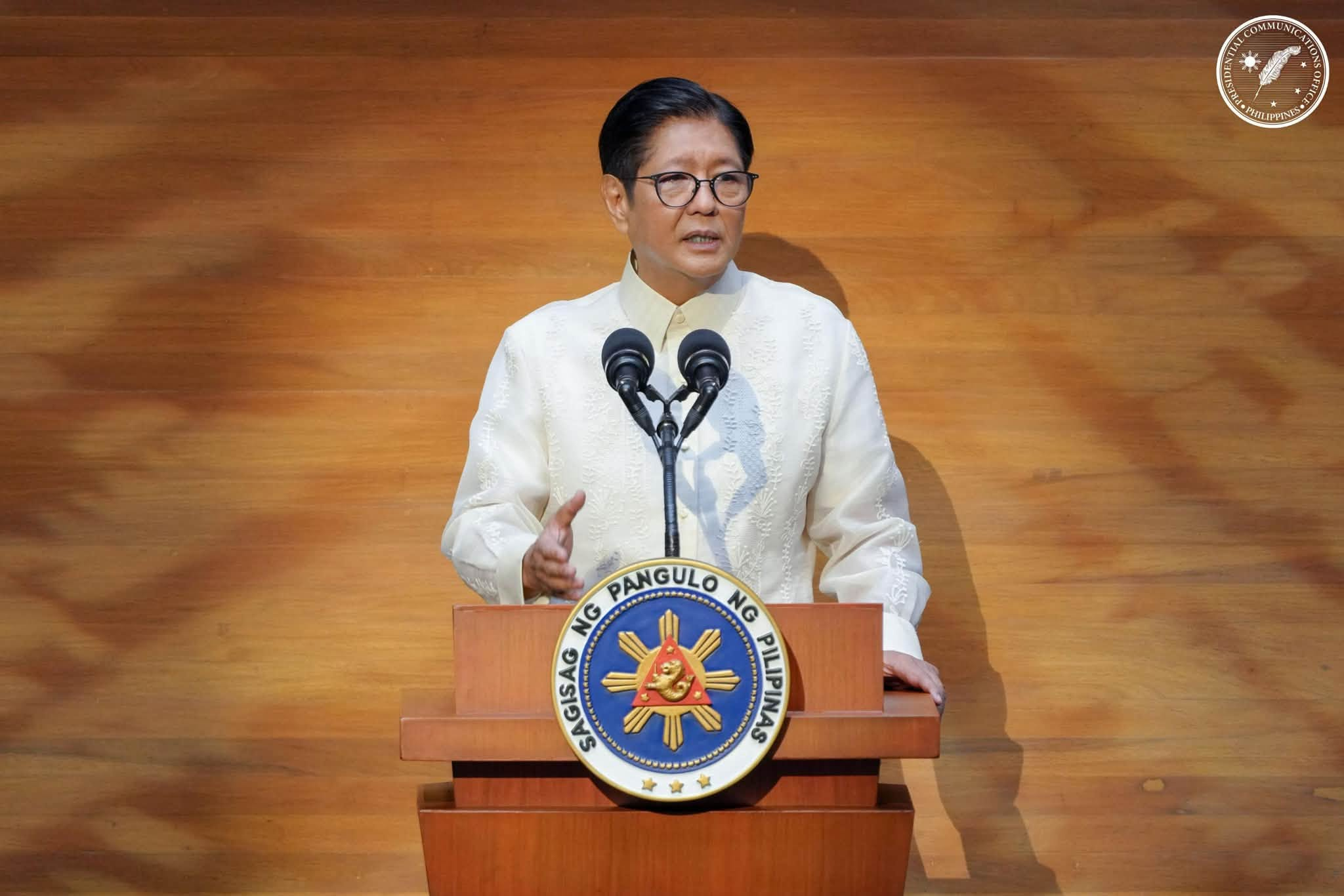
President Bongbong Marcos addressing the State of the Nation.

Before President Bongbong Marcos started his speech, the singing of "Lupang Hinirang" by the Philippine Charity Sweepstakes Office (PCSO) Chorale was held. This was followed by a rendition of "Let There Be Peace on Earth" performed by The Company ex-member Reuben Laurente as the nation's prayer.

Marcos' speech focused on addressing the nation's economic challenges and anti-corruption efforts, highlighted by the announcement that his cousin, former House Speaker Martin Romualdez, faces impending charges before the Office of the Ombudsman over the flood control projects scandal. He received the first standing ovation of his address after declaring that he was the president not of his family or friends, but of the Filipino people. To mitigate the impact of the 2026 Iran war fuel crisis, Marcos outlined fuel subsidies, price rollbacks, and proposed tax reforms, including raising the individual income tax exemption threshold to ₱350,000 and amending the Electric Power Industry Reform Act (EPIRA) to remove system loss fees from electricity bills. He also detailed major social and development programs, covering the Pambansang Pabahay Para sa Pilipino (4PH) program, new Malampaya gas reserves, 10,000 new school counselors, expanded PhilHealth medicine coverage, and ventures like the Pax Silica Industrial Hub in New Clark City and the country's first spaceport in Cagayan. The President honored the three fatalities of the Tacloban school shooting, offering heartfelt condolences to the bereaved families affected by school violence, and urged collective action to protect children from harms and violence. Additionally, he celebrated Alex Eala and the Philippines women's national football team for their historic athletic achievements. Finally, Marcos reaffirmed internal peace initiatives in Bangsamoro Autonomous Region and asserted the country's sovereignty on the tenth anniversary of the South China Sea Arbitration, declaring that "We are Filipinos, and we do not yield."

Marcos' speech began at 4:05 p.m. and ended at 5:30 p.m, both times PHT, lasting for 1 hour and 25 minutes—his longest so far. It was delivered mostly in Filipino, with some parts in English.

== Response ==
=== Senate ===
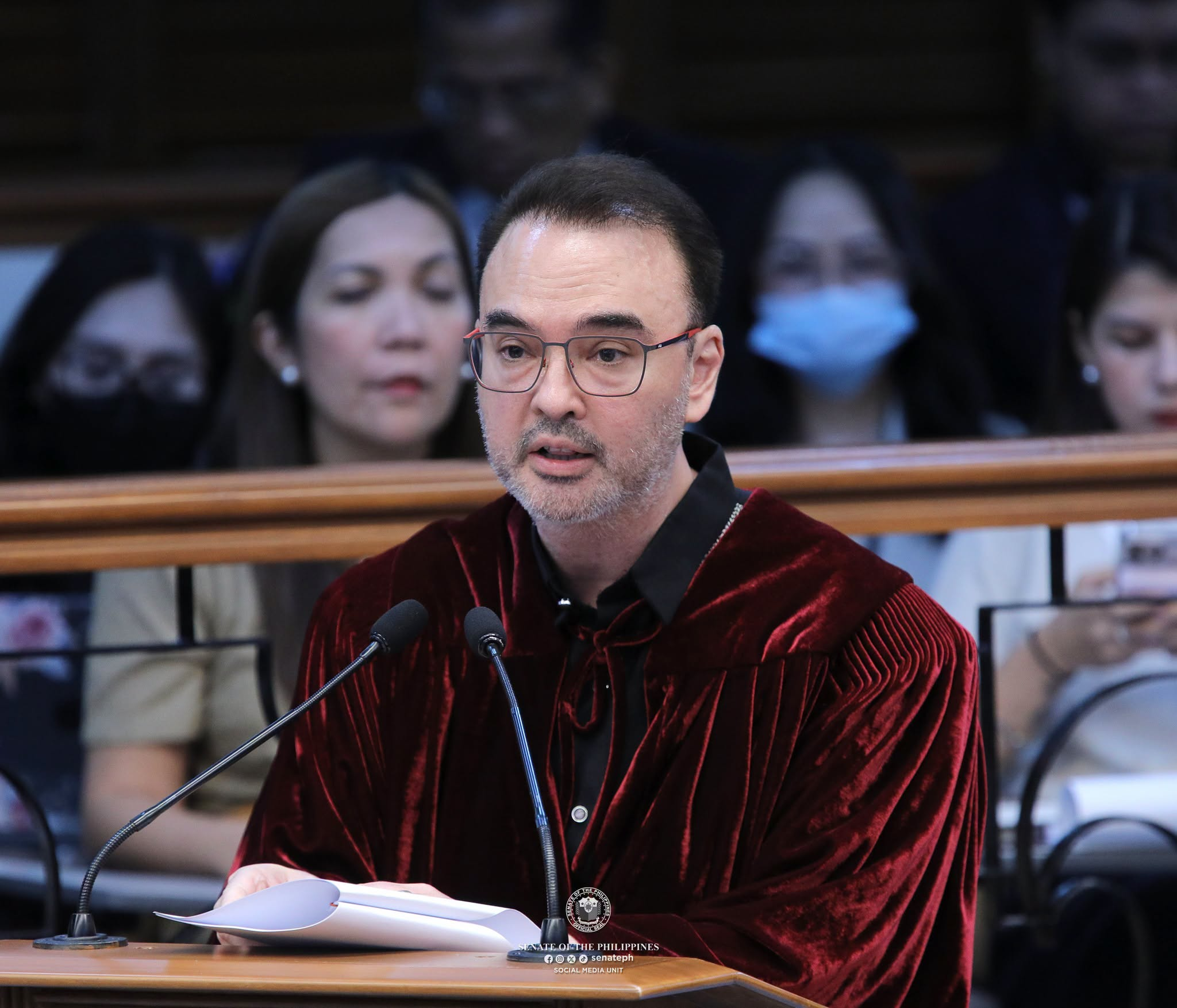
Senate Minority Leader Alan Peter Cayetano delivered the opposition's kontra-SONA in the Senate.

Ahead of the address, Senate minority leader Alan Peter Cayetano announced on July 24, 2026, that he would deliver a kontra-SONA (transl. counter SONA), the equivalent of the opposition's response to the U.S. State of the Union Address, at the Senate on July 28. Following the parliamentary tradition of allowing the minority to respond to the president's address, Cayetano said that "SONA" should instead stand for "SANA" ("stewarding a national agenda", an acronym derived from the Filipino word for "hope" or "wish"). In addition, the Senate impeachment court adjusted the calendar for Vice President Sara Duterte's ongoing impeachment trial, scheduling proceedings for its fourth week on July 29 and 30 to accommodate the SONA, the kontra-SONA, and the opening of the second regular session of the 20th Congress.

In the kontra-SONA, Cayetano criticized the Marcos administration for alleged selective justice and defended senators Jinggoy Estrada and Rodante Marcoleta, who are in detention for respective plunder charges. He urged President Marcos to act as a fair leader while demanding key reforms, including the abolition of the K-12 curriculum, amendment of the Local Government Code of the Philippines, and increased rural development funding. He also highlighted fellow minority senator Robin Padilla, whom he described as an ally of Jose Rizal due to his staunch advocacy for federalism in the Philippines.

== See also ==
- List of joint sessions of legislatures of the Philippines

== Notes ==
| Preceded by 2025 State of the Nation Address | State of the Nation Address; 2026 | Succeeded by 2027 State of the Nation Address |
