= 1972 State of the Nation Address (Philippines) =

State of the Nation Address of the Philippines

1972 Message to the Congress on the State of the Nation
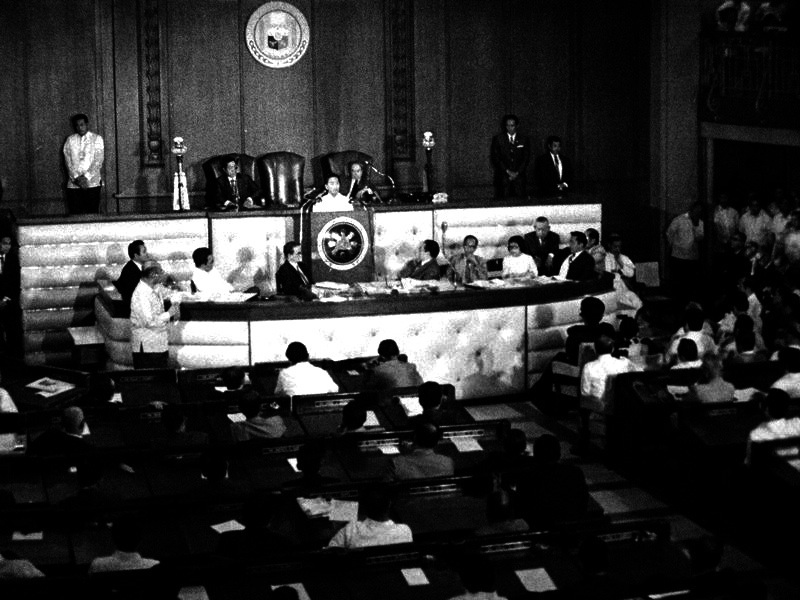
- President Ferdinand Marcos delivers his 7th State of the Nation Address
- Date: January 24, 1972
- Venue: Session Hall, Legislative Building
- Location: Manila, Philippines; 14°35′13″N 120°58′52″E
- Participants: Ferdinand Marcos; Gil Puyat; Cornelio Villareal
- Languages: English
- Previous: 1971 State of the Nation Address
- Next: 1973 State of the Nation Address

The 1972 Message to the Congress on the State of the Nation, entitled "Strength through Crisis, Growth in Freedom", was the 7th State of the Nation Address (SONA) delivered by Ferdinand Marcos, the 10th president of the Philippines, on January 24, 1972. It was the last SONA of a Philippine president delivered at the Legislative Building before succeeding addresses were held at the Batasang Pambansa Complex, beginning in 1978, and the last delivered before a joint session of Congress prior to its abolition following the adoption of the 1973 Constitution.

The joint session was presided over by Senate President Gil Puyat and House Speaker Cornelio Villareal.

Marcos's address centered on the country's political and economic challenges amid growing social unrest, following events including the reestablishment of the Communist Party of the Philippines and the subsequent creation of Communist front organizations, the bombing of Plaza Miranda during the 1971 Senate election campaign, and the ongoing Moro conflict. He highlighted the government's economic achievements, including growth in national income, exports, and investment, while outlining the development plans for the next three years. Marcos also discussed agricultural production, employment, land reform, rural development, and measures to address rice shortages. Concluding the address, Marcos emphasized the resilience of Philippine democracy and argued that the nation's recent crises had strengthened Filipinos and their commitment to freedom.

In retrospect, the SONA has been viewed as a precursor to Marcos's declaration of martial law in September later that year. While he delivered the speech within the framework of constitutional democracy, it emphasized political instability, communist insurgency, social unrest, and the need for stronger government action, themes that the president would later invoke to justify the imposition of martial law.

Preceded by 1971 State of the Nation Address	State of the Nation Address; 1972	Succeeded by 1973 State of the Nation Address
