= 1950 Address on the State of the Nation (Philippines) =

State of the Nation Address of the Philippines

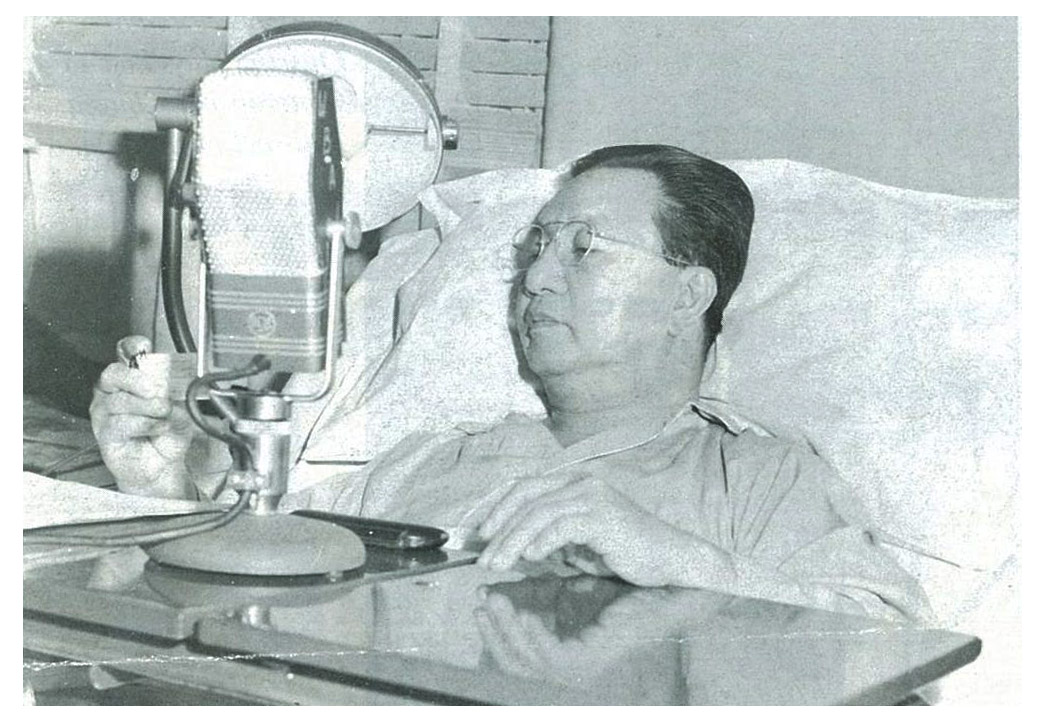
- President Elpidio Quirino delivers his second State of the Nation Address from his hospital bed at the Johns Hopkins Hospital in Baltimore, Maryland on January 23, 1950.
- Date: January 23, 1950 (Note: Philippine Standard Time (UTC+8). Radio broadcast was picked up in the Philippines at 10:00 am on January 23.)
- Venue: Legislative Building, Manila, Philippines and Johns Hopkins Hospital, Baltimore, Maryland, U.S.
- Location: 39°17′46″N 76°35′30″W
- Participants: Elpidio Quirino; Mariano Cuenco; Eugenio Pérez
- Languages: English
- Previous: 1949 State of the Nation Address
- Next: 1951 State of the Nation Address

The 1950 Address on the State of the Nation was the second State of the Nation Address (SONA) delivered by Elpidio Quirino, the 6th president of the Philippines, on January 23, 1950.

== Address content and delivery ==
It is the only SONA to be delivered through radio broadcast to the Congress of the Philippines and the only one where the president did not personally attend the Congress' joint session. The State of the Nation Address that was picked up was delivered on 10:00 am of January 23, 1950. Elpidio Quirino was then in the United States, confined at the Johns Hopkins Hospital in Baltimore. He was recovering from a heart ailment. Radio Computing Services was responsible for relaying the radio broadcast from Quirino in the United States to the Philippines. A Philippine-based radio network picked up the broadcast. Speakers were set up back at the meeting place of the joint session.

== Notes ==
Preceded by 1949 State of the Nation Address	State of the Nation Address; 1950	Succeeded by 1951 State of the Nation Address
