= 2019 State of the Nation Address (Philippines) =

Speech by Philippine President Rodrigo Duterte

Fourth State of the Nation Address of President Rodrigo Duterte
- Full video of the speech as published by Radio Television Malacañang
- Date: July 22, 2019
- Duration: 1 hour and 33 minutes
- Venue: Session Hall, Batasang Pambansa Complex
- Location: Quezon City, Philippines; 14°41′36″N 121°5′40″E
- Filmed by: Radio Television Malacañang
- Participants: Rodrigo Duterte; Tito Sotto; Alan Peter Cayetano
- Language: English & Filipino (Taglish)
- Previous: 2018 State of the Nation Address
- Next: 2020 State of the Nation Address

The 2019 State of the Nation Address was the fourth State of the Nation Address (SONA) delivered by Rodrigo Duterte, the 16th president of the Philippines, on July 22, 2019, at the Batasang Pambansa Complex.

== Preparations ==
The House of Representatives has allocated a budget of ₱4.7 million for the State of the Nation Address with about 1,500 people invited for the event. Weavers displaced by the Battle of Marawi also prepared a balod or traditional Maranao drape which was used as a backdrop for President Rodrigo Duterte for his speech.

Film director, Joyce Bernal was commissioned to be involved in the coverage of the speech.

== Address content and delivery ==
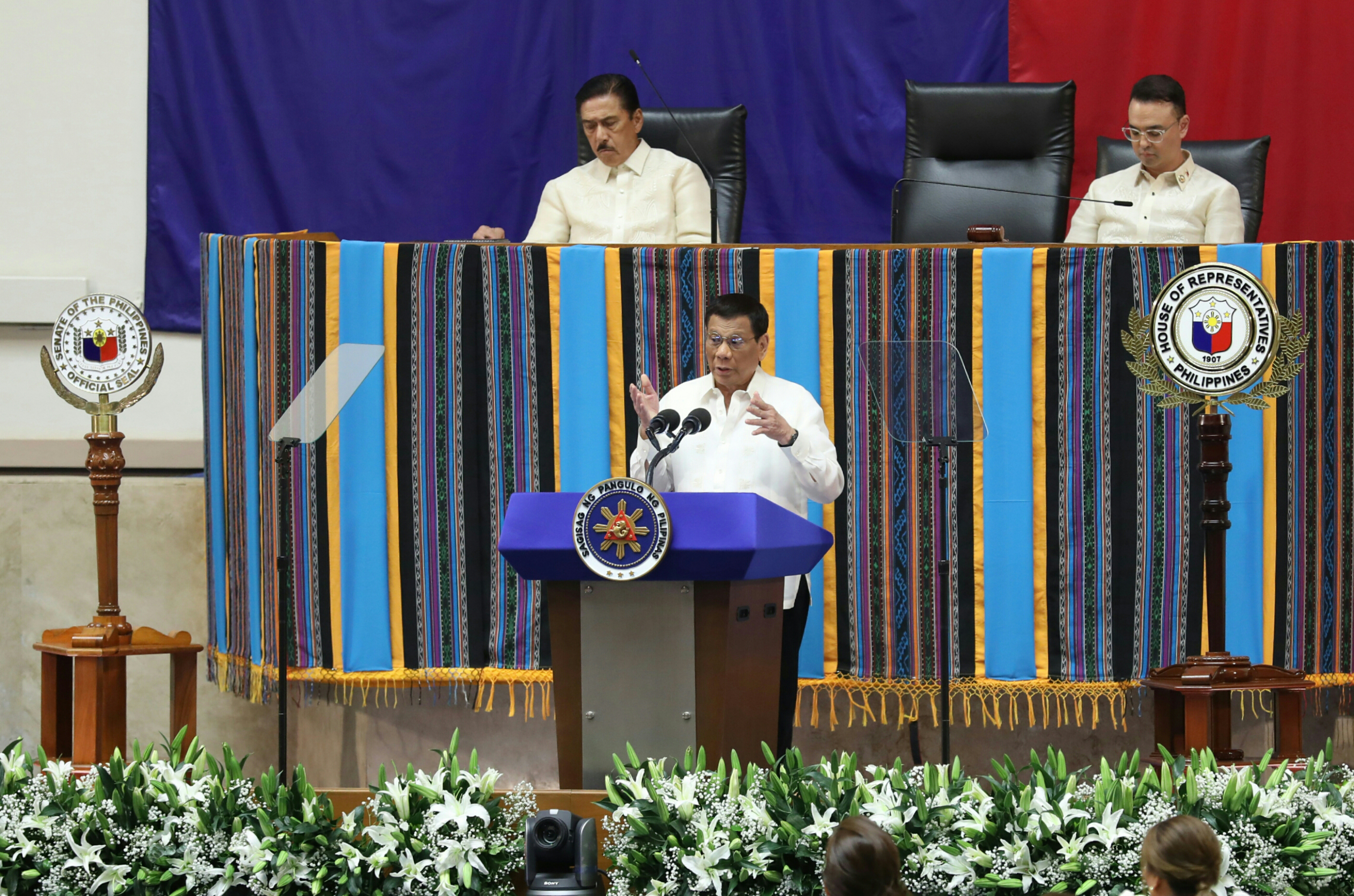
Duterte (center) delivers his State of the Nation Address

In the program took 1 hour and 33 minutes, Duterte spoke about corruption and the economy. He urged the Congress to pass 18 bills. This includes measures involving the reinstatement of death penalty for heinous crimes such as involvement in the illegal drug trade and plunder, the creation of a National Academy of Sports for high school students, a Magna Carta for barangays, and the postponement of the 2020 barangay elections.

Duterte also threatened to close Land Bank if they don't come up with a plan for farmers by the end of July 2019. The president felt that the bank has strayed from its intended purposes of being a bank for farmers lamenting that it has been "mired in so many commercial transactions."

The Philippines' policy towards China and the South China Sea dispute was also a subject of the speech. Duterte defended his foreign policy amidst accusation of treason. He insisted on having negotiations with the Chinese and stated that the Philippine military don't stand a chance against their Chinese counterparts in an event of a war. He also said that he has allowed the Chinese to fish in the disputed territory saying that countries around the South China Sea has traditional fishing rights. However Duterte has vowed to push for the Philippine claim in the area in due time.

Preceded by 2018 State of the Nation Address	State of the Nation Address; 2019	Succeeded by 2020 State of the Nation Address
