= 1945 State of the Nation Address (Philippines) =

State of the Nation Address of the Philippines

1945 Message to the First Congress of the Commonwealth of Philippines
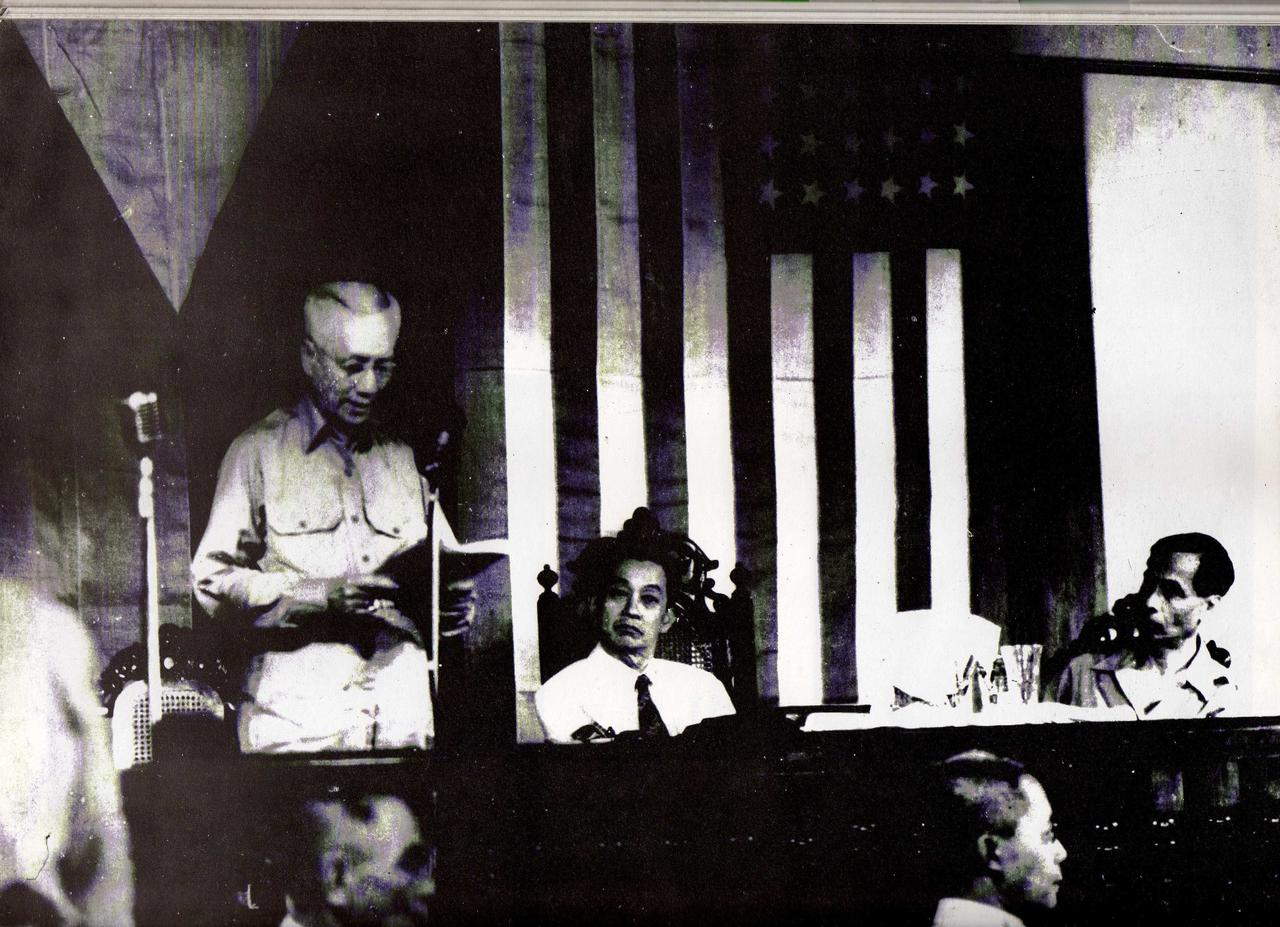
- President Sergio Osmeña (standing, left) delivers his first and only State of the Nation Address; House speaker Jose Zulueta (seated, center) and Senate president Manuel Roxas (not pictured) preside over the joint session.
- Date: June 9, 1945
- Venue: Temporary Congress Building, Old Japanese Schoolhouse
- Location: Lepanto Street, Manila, Philippines; 14°36′39.92″N 120°59′48.08″E
- Participants: Sergio Osmeña; Manuel Roxas; Jose Zulueta
- Languages: English
- Previous: 1941 State of the Nation Address
- Next: 1946 State of the Nation Address

The 1945 Message to the First Congress of the Commonwealth of Philippines was the first and only State of the Nation Address (SONA) delivered by Sergio Osmeña, the 4th president of the Philippines, on June 9, 1945, at the Temporary Congress Building at Lepanto (now S.H. Loyola) Street, Manila.

A former Japanese schoolhouse on Lepanto Street was used by the reconvened Congress after the destruction of the Legislative Building during World War II.

The joint session was presided over by Senate President Manuel Roxas and House Speaker Jose Zulueta.

Osmeña's address emphasized the restoration of the Commonwealth government following the liberation of the Philippines from Japanese occupation during World War II. He reported on the activities of the Commonwealth government-in-exile in Washington, D.C., the conditions endured by Filipinos during the occupation, and the contributions of guerrilla forces to the liberation campaign. Osmeña also outlined the challenges of postwar reconstruction, economic recovery, and the reestablishment of public institutions, while emphasizing national unity and preparation for the country's forthcoming independence the following year. He ended the address with a call for cooperation in rebuilding the country after its devastation during the war and congratulated the members of the 1st Commonwealth Congress.

Osmeña did not deliver any further State of the Nation Addresses after losing his bid for a full term in the 1946 presidential election to Senate president Roxas.

Preceded by 1941 State of the Nation Address	State of the Nation Address; 1945	Succeeded by 1946 State of the Nation Address
