= 1978 State of the Nation Address (Philippines) =

State of the Nation Address of the Philippines

1978 Message on the State of the Nation
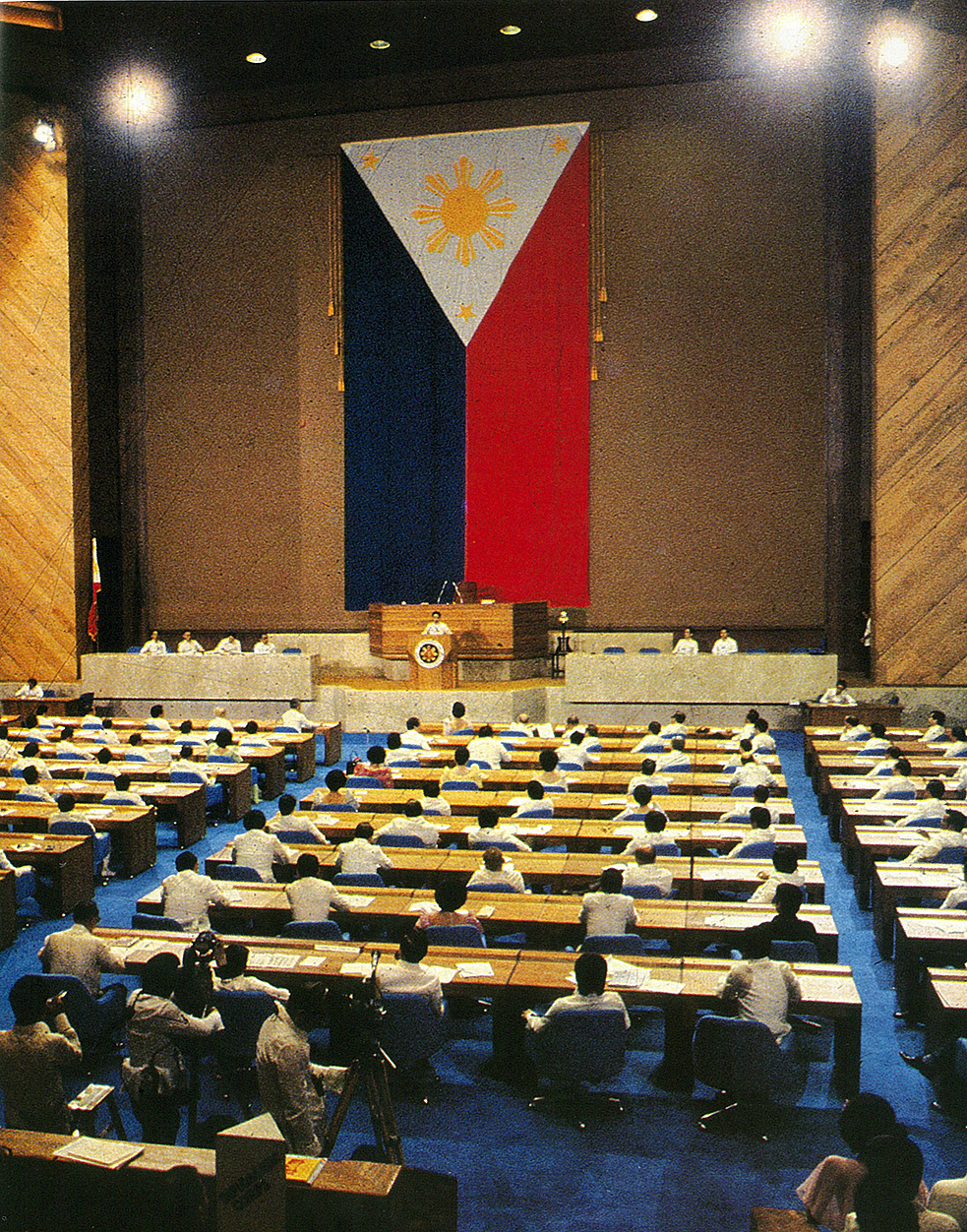
- President Ferdinand Marcos delivers his 13th State of the Nation Address
- Date: June 12, 1978
- Venue: Session Hall, Batasang Pambansa Complex
- Location: Quezon City, Philippines; 14°41′36″N 121°5′40″E
- Participants: Ferdinand Marcos
- Languages: English
- Previous: 1977 State of the Nation Address
- Next: 1979 State of the Nation Address

The 1978 Message on the State of the Nation, entitled "A Bold Experiment", was the 13th State of the Nation Address (SONA) delivered by Ferdinand Marcos, the 10th president and 3rd prime minister of the Philippines, on June 12, 1978. It was the first SONA of a Philippine president delivered at the Batasang Pambansa Complex.

Marcos, who had been serving as president since 1965, was confirmed as prime minister by the newly inaugurated Interim Batasang Pambansa, a unicameral legislative assembly that succeeded the abolished bicameral Congress. His address focused on the assembly's establishment and the adoption of a parliamentary system under the new 1973 Constitution. Marcos presented the establishment of the new form of government as a means of transitioning from emergency rule as a president who had absorbed legislative powers to constitutional governance, while retaining the reforms of the Bagong Lipunan (New Society) reform movement. Marcos highlighted achievements in economic development, rural modernization, land reform, peace and order, and foreign relations, crediting these with the policies he introduced since declaring martial law in 1972. He also emphasized political participation through the relatively new barangay system, national self-reliance, poverty alleviation, and the strengthening of democratic institutions under the new parliamentary system. Marcos's address concluded with a call for national unity and support for the government's agenda for development and reform.

Preceded by 1977 State of the Nation Address	State of the Nation Address; 1978	Succeeded by 1979 State of the Nation Address
