= 2018 State of the Nation Address (Philippines) =

Speech by Philippine President Rodrigo Duterte

Third State of the Nation Address of President Rodrigo Duterte
- Full video of the speech as published by Radio Television Malacañang
- Date: July 23, 2018
- Duration: 48 minutes
- Venue: Session Hall, Batasang Pambansa Complex
- Location: Quezon City, Philippines; 14°41′36″N 121°5′40″E
- Filmed by: Radio Television Malacañang
- Participants: Rodrigo Duterte; Tito Sotto; Pantaleon Alvarez
- Language: English
- Previous: 2017 State of the Nation Address
- Next: 2019 State of the Nation Address

The 2018 State of the Nation Address was the third State of the Nation Address (SONA) delivered by Rodrigo Duterte, the 16th president of the Philippines, on July 23, 2018, at the Batasang Pambansa Complex.

== Preparations ==
On June 5, 2018, Joyce Bernal who is known for her romance comedy films, was selected to direct the 2018 State of the Nation Address. She was recommended by actor Robin Padilla to President Rodrigo Duterte with the head of state approving the suggestion.

== Delay and House of Representatives leadership dispute ==
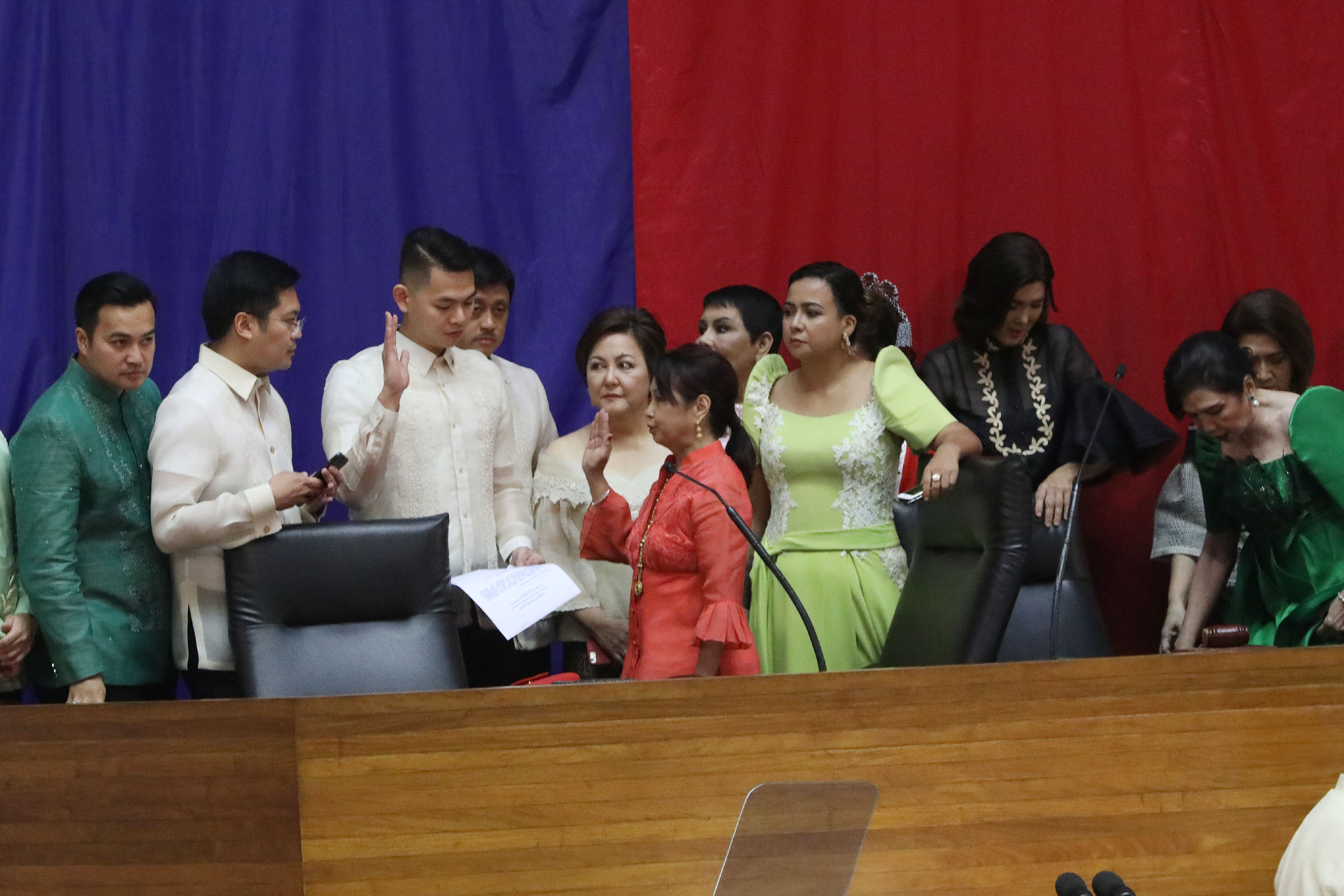
Gloria Macapagal Arroyo takes oath as Speaker of the House of Representatives.

Gloria Macapagal Arroyo was installed as Speaker of the House of Representatives with 161 members voting for her appointment. Pantaleon Alvarez disputes the appointment and his allies blocked the declaration of the position as vacant. This caused the delay to the lower house's ratification of the Bangsamoro Organic Law.

The State of the Nation Address was delayed by around 30 minutes.

== Program ==
The program took 48 minutes.

== Address content and delivery ==
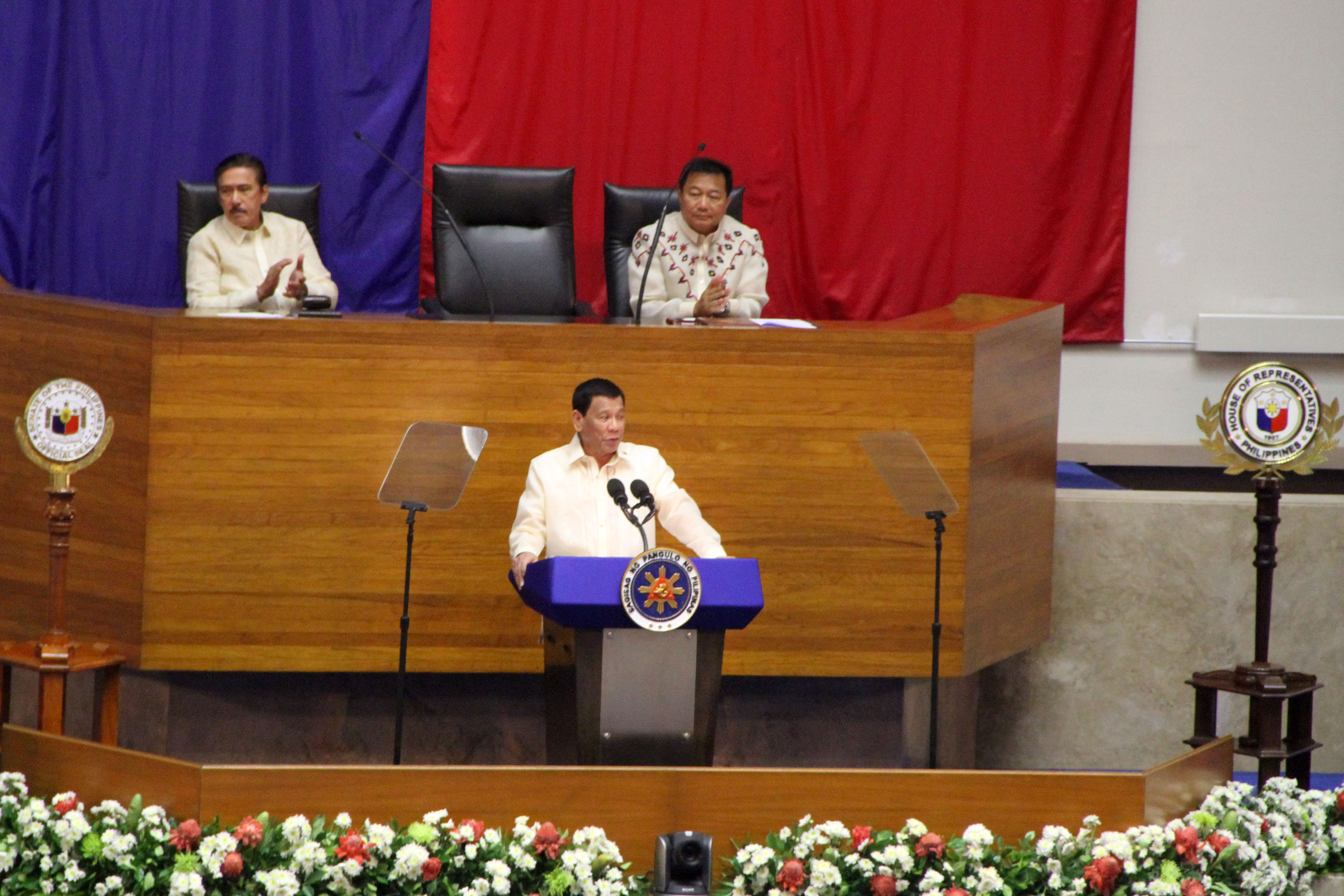
Duterte (center) delivers his State of the Nation Address

Rodrigo Duterte opened his speech vowing to continue pursuing his controversial campaign against illegal drugs saying that he is "for human lives" criticizing human rights activists opposing the campaign.

He also mentioned the Philippines partnership with Malaysia and Indonesia against piracy in their shared maritime borders as well as the country's cooperation with China against illegal drugs. Duterte added that the cooperation of the country with China doesn't mean the Philippines will stop pursuing its national interest in relation to the South China Sea dispute.

In relation to the issue of endo contractualization, Duterte reiterates he cannot put a stop to the issue himself having issued Executive Order 51 on May 1, 2018, prohibiting the illegal contracting and sub-contracting of workers. He called for the Congress to pass a legislation putting an end to contractualization.

The President also urged the implementation of Republic Act 11032 or the Ease of Doing Business and Efficient Government Service Delivery Act of 2018 calling for the deduction of red tape in government agencies.

Duterte also warned the mining industry regarding destructive mining practices saying it should be "used for the benefit of the Filipino people, not just a select few" and that complying with tax requirements isn't satisfactory compensation since he "can get it from other sources". He also condemned rice cartels for creating an artificial rice shortage and urged the Congress for the passage of a legislation relating to rice importation.

The Bangsamoro Organic Law, which had its ratification by the House of Representative delayed due to a leadership dispute in the lower house, will be signed within 48 hours as per Duterte's pledge during the speech.

Duterte ended the speech saying he would not bore the audience with a list of projects by the administration.

Preceded by 2017 State of the Nation Address	State of the Nation Address; 2018	Succeeded by 2019 State of the Nation Address
