= 2016 State of the Nation Address (Philippines) =

Speech by Philippine President Rodrigo Duterte

First State of the Nation Address of President Rodrigo Duterte
- Full video of the speech as published by Radio Television Malacañang
- Date: July 25, 2016
- Duration: 1 hour and 33 minutes
- Venue: Session Hall, Batasang Pambansa Complex
- Location: Quezon City, Philippines; 14°41′36″N 121°5′40″E
- Filmed by: Radio Television Malacañang
- Participants: Rodrigo Duterte; Koko Pimentel; Pantaleon Alvarez
- Language: English
- Previous: 2015 State of the Nation Address
- Next: 2017 State of the Nation Address

The 2016 State of the Nation Address was the first State of the Nation Address (SONA) delivered by Rodrigo Duterte, the 16th president of the Philippines, on July 25, 2016, at the Batasang Pambansa Complex.

== Seating and guests ==
Three former Presidents, Fidel Ramos, Joseph Estrada, and Gloria Macapagal Arroyo attended the SONA. This was the first time that Arroyo attended Congress after being detained for four years at the Veterans Memorial Medical Center in Quezon City, after the Supreme Court voted 11-4, dismissing the plunder case filed against her in connection with the alleged misuse of the Philippine Charity Sweepstakes Office's P366-million intelligence fund.

Among those who also attended were Vice President Leni Robredo, Chief Justice Maria Lourdes Sereno, and Papal Nuncio and Head of the Diplomatic Corps, Giuseppe Pinto. Former President and Duterte's predecessor, Benigno Aquino III skipped the event.

== Preparations ==
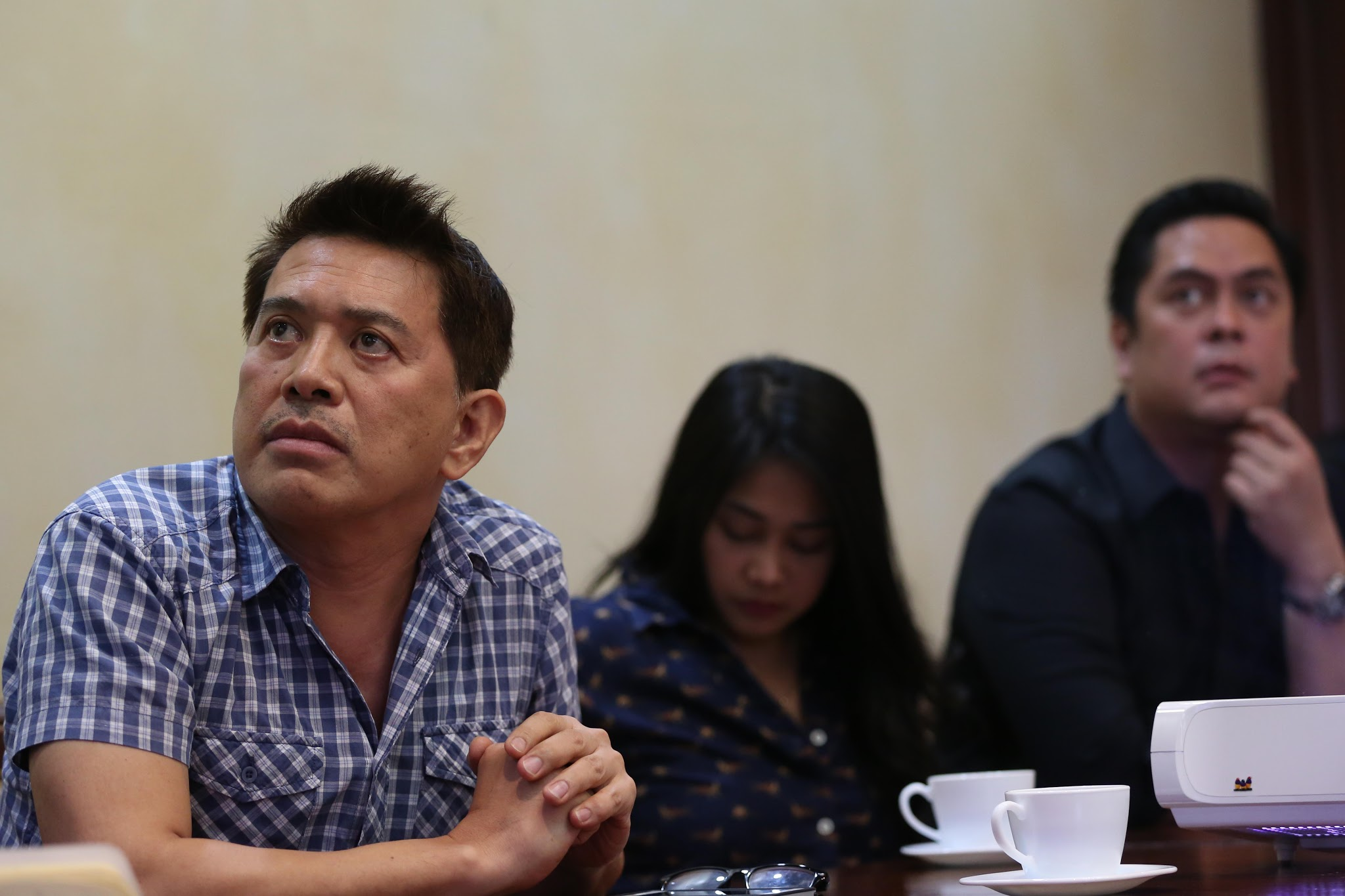
Independent film director Brillante Mendoza (left) and Presidential Communications Office Secretary Martin Andanar (right) examine the map of the Batasang Pambansa during the First SONA Briefing and Planning at the Batasang Pambansa on July 18, 2016.

Independent film director Brillante Mendoza has accepted the offer by PCO Secretary Martin Andanar to direct the first State of the Nation Address of President Duterte. Andanar held a meeting, with Mendoza, director and TV host Jun Sabayton and PCO Assistant Secretary for Strategic Communications Ramon Cualoping III to discuss several details of the SONA.

Mayor Herbert Bautista announced that there will be no classes in all levels in Quezon City on the day of the State of the Nation Address itself, particularly in schools near the Batasang Pambansa.

== Program ==
President Duterte arrived at the Session Hall of the House of Representatives at 4:00pm (PST). After the President's arrival, Senate President Koko Pimentel and House Speaker Pantaleon Alvarez convened the joint session of both houses. The national anthem was sung by folk singer Bayang Barrios, followed by an interfaith unity prayer led by representatives from the Catholic Church, Protestants, Muslims and the Iglesia ni Cristo.

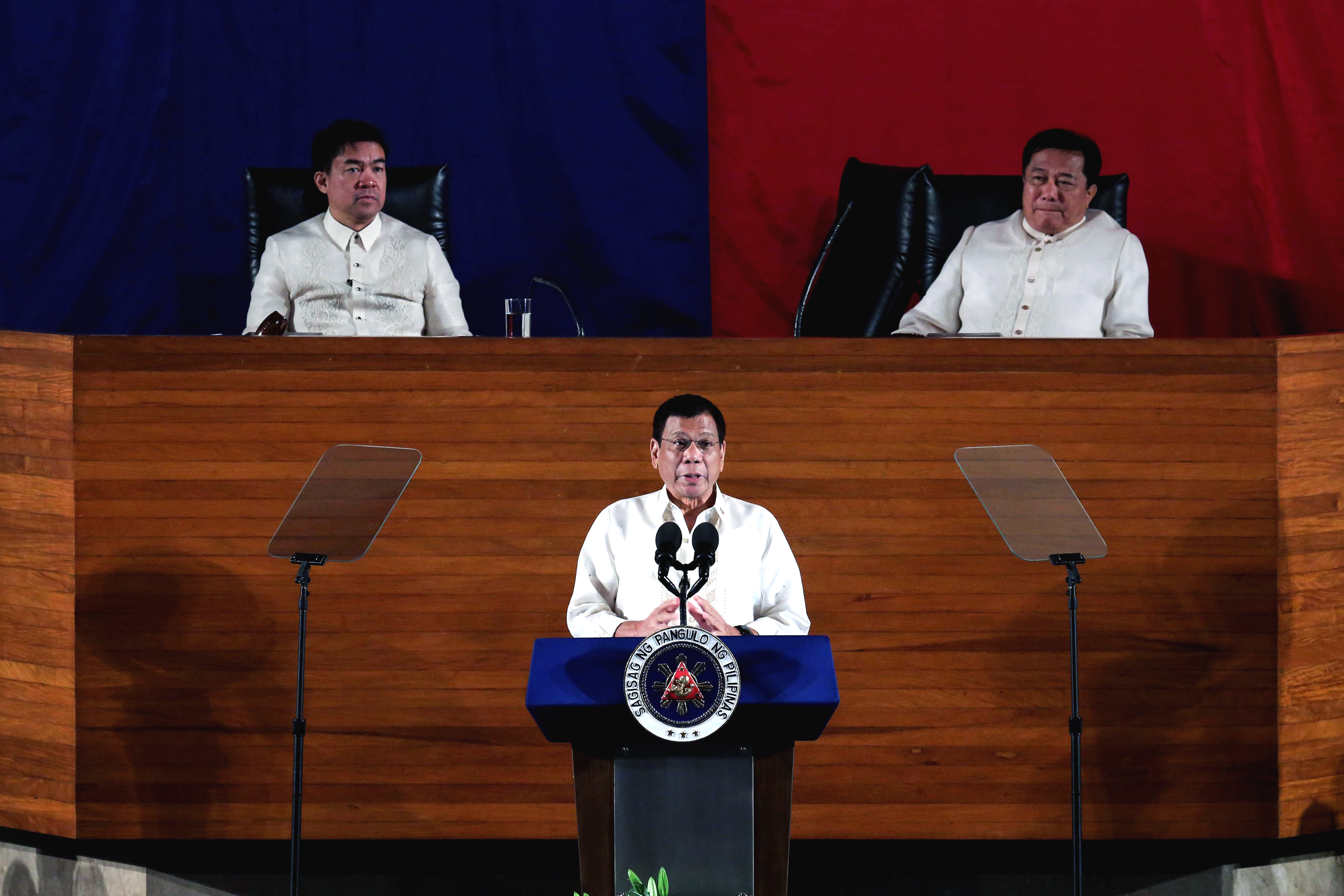
President Rodrigo Duterte delivering his first State of the Nation Address at the Batasang Pambansa in Quezon City.

The original speech of the president was intended to last for about 38 minutes, but due to additional ad libs of Duterte, the first State of the Nation Address ran for 1 hour and 33 minutes.

After the joint session was adjourned, Militant groups who just finished a demonstration rally outside the Batasang Pambansa to show their support to the Duterte administration went on a meeting with President Duterte.

== Address content and delivery ==
President Duterte began his first SONA by saying that he will not resort into fingerpointing against the past administration.

Preceded by 2015 State of the Nation Address	State of the Nation Address; 2016	Succeeded by 2017 State of the Nation Address
