= 2020 State of the Nation Address (Philippines) =

Speech by Philippine President Rodrigo Duterte

Fifth State of the Nation Address of President Rodrigo Duterte
- Full video of the speech as published by Radio Television Malacañang
- Date: July 27, 2020
- Duration: 1 hour and 41 minutes
- Venue: Session Hall, Batasang Pambansa Complex
- Location: Quezon City, Philippines; 14°41′36″N 121°5′40″E
- Filmed by: Radio Television Malacañang
- Participants: Rodrigo Duterte; Tito Sotto; Alan Peter Cayetano
- Language: English & Filipino (Taglish)
- Previous: 2019 State of the Nation Address
- Next: 2021 State of the Nation Address

The 2020 State of the Nation Address was the fifth State of the Nation Address (SONA) delivered by Rodrigo Duterte, the 16th president of the Philippines, on July 27, 2020, at the Batasang Pambansa Complex.

== Preparations ==
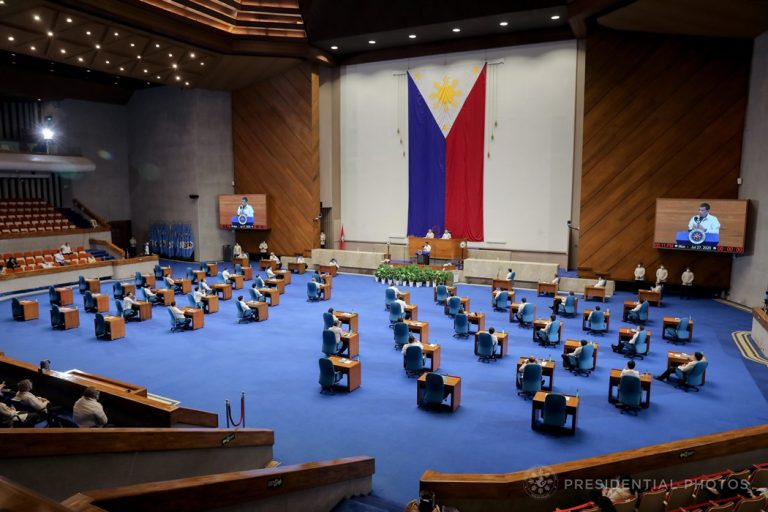
The session hall had limited physical attendance due to social distancing measures observed in response to the ongoing COVID-19 pandemic.

Due to the COVID-19 pandemic in the Philippines, there was uncertainty on whether President Rodrigo Duterte would be physically present in the Session Hall of the Batasang Pambansa Complex to deliver his annual State of the Nation Address. Among the options considered as mentioned by Presidential spokesperson Harry Roque was Duterte delivering his speech via video conference from Malacañang.

On July 20, 2020, Roque confirmed that Duterte "will be physically present in Batasan". The House of Representatives has also issued an advisory allowing only the government-owned Radio TV Malacañang (RTVM) to set up broadcast equipment for the said event and will be fed for use by other media entities. The event will also be live streamed through the YouTube and Facebook channels of RTVM.

The Metropolitan Manila Development Authority is expected to deploy about 1,000 traffic management personnel to help manage the traffic within the venue of the said event. Film director Joyce Bernal, who was commissioned to be involved in the coverage of the speech, has promised a simpler "very Filipino" SONA but with a "different flavor".

== Seating and guests ==
Attendees of the event at Batasang Pambansa were mandated to be swab tested for COVID-19 which included Speaker Alan Peter Cayetano, his wife Lani Cayetano, Deputy Speakers Raneo Abu and Dan Fernandez, and Minority Floor Leader Bienvenido Abante Jr. Only a maximum of 50 people were allowed to be physically present in the venue, said Presidential Communications Secretary Martin Andanar. In the event that many of the guests would test positive from COVID-19, Andanar said that the event will be moved to the Rizal Hall of Malacañang.

Deputy Speaker and Surigao del Sur Representative Johnny Pimentel, who was among the expected attendees, test positive and so was six personnel from Malacañang who were part of the technical team of the event.

Senator Migz Zubiri opted not to attend the event.

== Address content and delivery ==
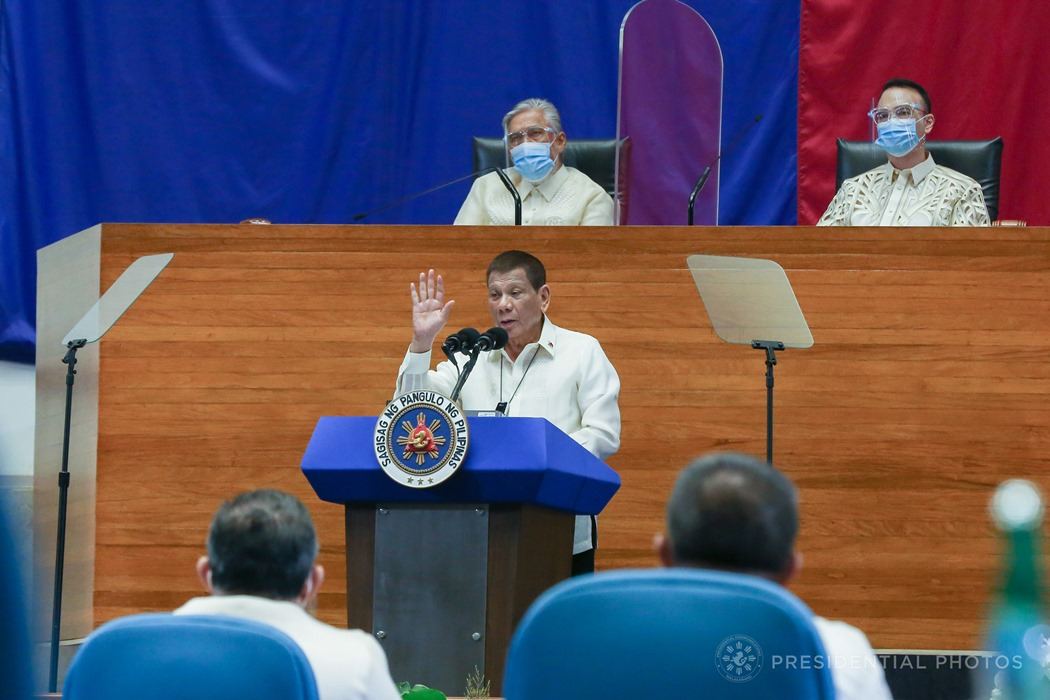
President Rodrigo Duterte delivers his 5th State of the Nation Address at the House of Representatives Complex in Quezon City on July 27, 2020.

In his speech which lasted for 1 hour and 41 minutes, Duterte addressed the current pandemic and its effects to the country. He urged Congress to pass 21 priority bills among which includes the passage of COVID-19-related bills such as the "Bayanihan to Recover as One Act", "Corporate Recovery and Tax Incentives for Enterprises (Create) Act" and "Financial Institutions Strategic Transfer (Fist) Act"; the lifting of continuing professional development (CPD) units requirement on professionals and the re-imposition of death penalty in the country. Also among the proposed measures were the creation of new government agencies such as a Department of Overseas Filipinos to focus on Filipino migrant workers, a Department of Disaster Resilience to spearhead in disaster response, a National Disease Prevention and Management Authority which will equip the country from future disease outbreaks and a Boracay Island Development Authority that will oversee the post-rehabilitation aspect of Boracay Island.

Duterte began his speech with a tirade against ABS-CBN, the Lopezes who own the company and Senate Minority Floor Leader Franklin Drilon. He accused Drilon of defending the Lopezes as "oligarchs" and for linking the anti-dynasty system to his daughter Davao City Mayor Sara Duterte and son Davao City 1st District Representative Paolo Duterte. Drilon previously challenged Duterte to prioritize an anti-dynasty law if the latter wanted to dismantle oligarchy in the country however, he clarified after the speech that he "never mentioned the children of the President."

On the South China Sea dispute, Duterte lamented that he "cannot do anything" about it and said that the country could not afford going into war with China. He also rejected the idea of the return of foreign bases in Subic Bay fearing that it may result to "extinction of the Filipino race."

Telecommunications companies Globe Telecom and Smart Communications were also not spared by Duterte after he threatened them to improve their services or face expropriation as the country prepares for the March 2021 commercial roll out of Dito Telecommunity which aims to become the third major telecommunications provider in the Philippines.

Preceded by 2019 State of the Nation Address	State of the Nation Address; 2020	Succeeded by 2021 State of the Nation Address
