= State of the Nation Address (Philippines) =

Speech by the President of the Philippines

State of the Nation Address Talumpati sa Kalagayan ng Bansa
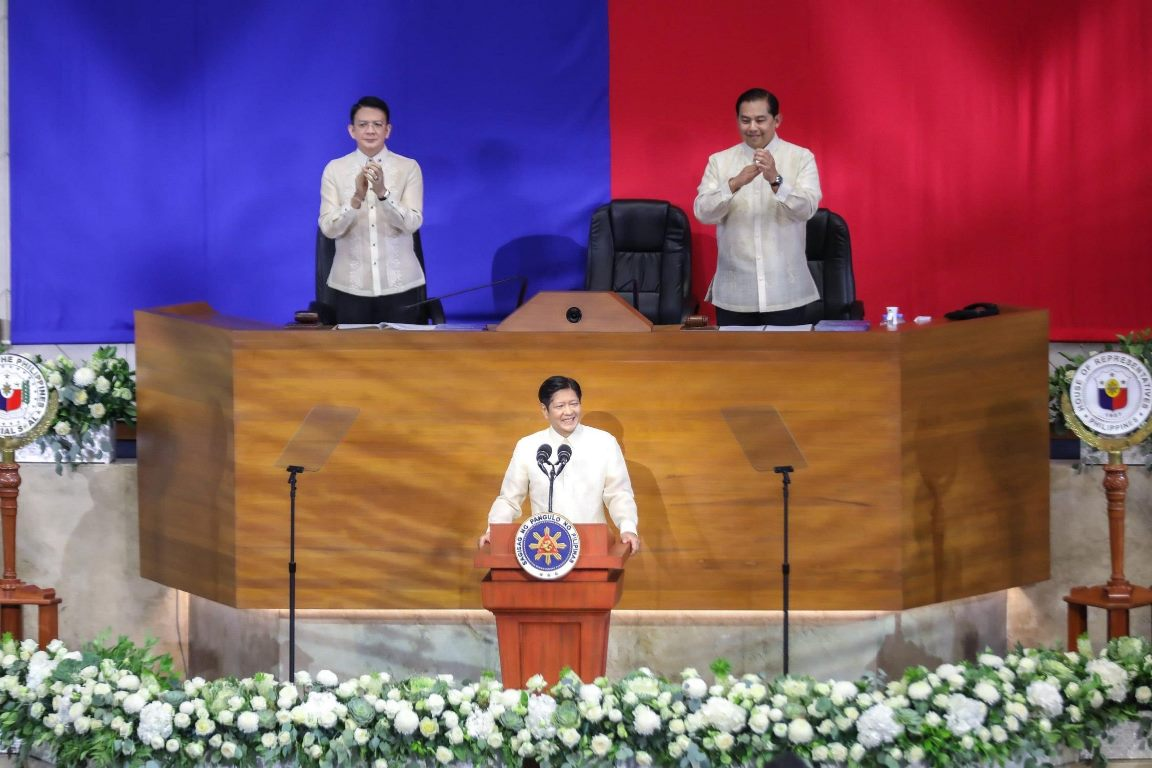
- President Bongbong Marcos delivering his third State of the Nation Address at the Session Hall of the Batasang Pambansa Complex on July 22, 2024.
- Status: Active
- Genre: Speech
- Frequency: Annually; 4th Monday of July
- Venue: Batasang Pambansa Complex
- Location: Quezon City
- Coordinates: 14°41′36″N 121°5′40″E
- Country: Philippines
- Inaugurated: June 16, 1936
- Most recent: July 27, 2026
- Next event: July 26, 2027
- Participants: President of the Philippines
- Attendance: Congress of the Philippines
- Website: stateofthenation.gov.ph

The State of the Nation Address (SONA [ˈsɔna]; Filipino: Talumpati sa Kalagayan ng Bansa) is an annual address by the president of the Philippines to a joint session of the Congress of the Philippines. Mandated by the 1987 Constitution, the speech is delivered on the fourth Monday of July at the Plenary Session Hall of the Batasang Pambansa Complex in Batasan Hills, Quezon City.

The SONA, which is often broadcast on live television, serves as a means to inform the nation about its present economic, political, and social condition. It is also a vehicle for the president to summarize the accomplishments and plans of their program of government both for a particular year and until the end of their term of office.

== Ceremonial of the President ==
The Address is usually delivered at around 16:00 PST (UTC+8). Before the appointed time, legislators enter the Plenary Session Hall, with members of Congress and their consorts in recent years sporting traditionally-inspired bespoke couture that, in some cases, expresses their legislative agenda or ideological leanings.

The president meanwhile arrives at the Batasang Pambansa Complex some minutes before the beginning of the joint session, and enters the main building through a back entrance. The president is then welcomed with military honors, and greeted by the speaker of the House, the president of the Senate, and the welcoming committee, before proceeding to the Presidential Legislative Liaison Office.

The president then enters the Plenary Session Hall as the presidential anthem (or administration theme) is played and approaches the rostrum and is seated. The president of the Senate and the speaker of the House then open the joint session, and the guest performer or group leads the now-standing assembly in singing Lupang Hinirang. Representatives of various religious groups then lead the assembly in an ecumenical prayer.

The House speaker then introduces the president in English or Filipino with words similar to the following:

"[Ladies and gentlemen], [honorable] members of [the] Congress [of the Philippines], [His/Her Excellency], [Name], [the] President [of (the Republic of) the Philippines]."

The address, which can last anywhere from one to several hours, is broadcast on television, radio, and online streaming by state agencies such as Radio Television Malacañang, as well as private media organizations.

== History ==
=== Malolos Congress ===
An early form of the address was in place during the First Philippine Republic, which was established in 1899 in Malolos, Bulacan. The revolutionary government took ideas from European parliaments, where the magisterial role of the head of state in the legislature was to mark the legislature's official opening.

The Malolos Constitution of 1899 provided for the president to preside over the opening of Congress, as well as convey his messages to the legislature through a secretary. When Emilio Aguinaldo addressed the Malolos Congress in Spanish on September 15, 1898, he simply congratulated the formation of the first representative body of the Philippines and Asia. This is not considered a State of the Nation Address because the Malolos Constitution did not explicitly provide for one.

=== American Period ===
The State of the Nation Address as an annual practice began during the Commonwealth Era.

The Jones Act enacted in 1916 was the first instance where a report about the Philippine Islands was required to be submitted. However, the law only mandated a report by the Governor-General to an executive office assigned by the President of the United States. This was in the form of a written document that discussed the transactions and movements of the Insular Government.

When the Commonwealth of the Philippines was created and the 1935 Constitution enacted, it provided for an annual report of the President of the Philippines to Congress:

"The President shall from time to time give to the Congress information on the state of the Nation, and recommend to its consideration such measures as he shall judge necessary and expedient."

The first formal State of the Nation Address was delivered by President Manuel L. Quezon on June 16, 1936 at the Legislative Building in Manila. The dates of the SONA were fixed on June 16 of every year at the start of opening sessions of Congress, by virtue of Commonwealth Act No. 17. However, CA 49 changed the date of the opening of Congress to October 16.

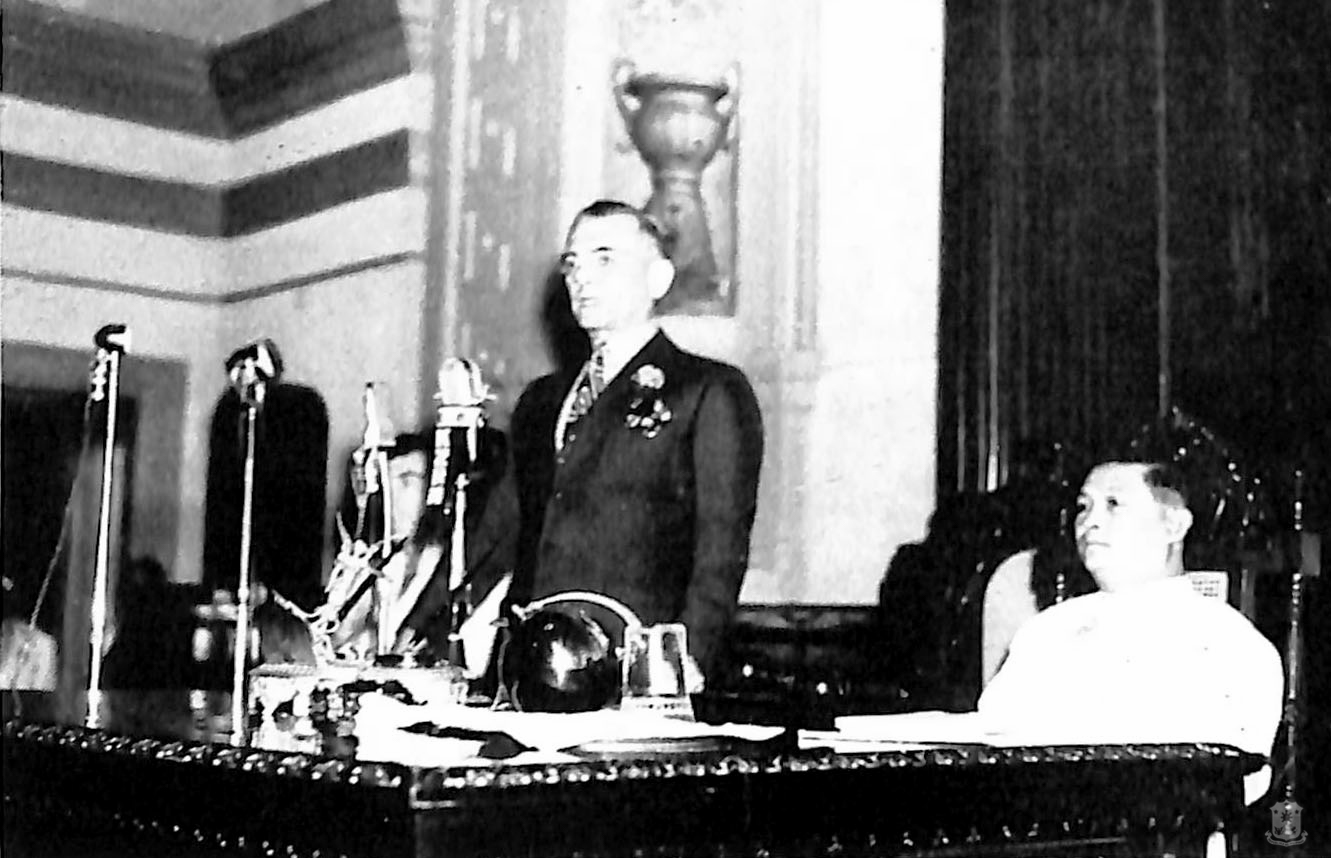
President Quezon delivering his 7th and last State of the Nation Address in January 1941

In 1937, October 16 fell on a Saturday, and the opening of Congress was moved to 18th, when Quezon gave the second State of the Nation Address. The opening date of Congress was again changed that year to the fourth Monday of every year. President Manuel L. Quezon delivered his final State of the Nation Address on January 31, 1941, prior to the onset of World War II.

==== Second World War ====
José P. Laurel, president of the Japanese-sponsored puppet Second Republic, was able to deliver his only message before the special session of the National Assembly, led by Speaker Benigno Aquino Sr., on 18 October at the Legislative Building—four days after the Second Republic's establishment. This is, however, not considered a SONA as the 1943 Constitution did not—as President Laurel himself pointed out—provide for such an address.

With the 1945 defeat of the Japanese Empire and the re-establishment of the Commonwealth Government, the now-bicameral Congress of the Philippines convened on June 9, 1945, the first time since their election in 1941. During this special session, President Sergio Osmeña gave his address before lawmakers at their provisional quarters (a repurposed schoolhouse) along Lepanto Street in Manila, and gave a comprehensive report on the work carried out by the Commonwealth Government during its three-year as a government-in-exile in Washington, D.C. Furthermore, he described the conditions prevailing in the Philippines during the Japanese Occupation and an acknowledgement of the invaluable assistance rendered by recognized guerrillas to combined Filipino and American forces in the liberation of the Philippines.

The last address in the Commonwealth period was delivered by President Manuel Roxas on June 3, 1946. President Roxas would later deliver the first SONA of the Third Philippine Republic in front of the First Congress on January 27, 1947.

=== Third Republic ===
Beginning in 1949, the SONA was delivered at the rebuilt Legislative Building. Only once did a president not appear personally before Congress: on January 23, 1950, President Elpidio Quirino, who was recuperating at the Johns Hopkins Hospital in Baltimore, Maryland, delivered his SONA to a joint session of Congress via RCA. The address was picked up by a local radio network at 10:00 Philippine Time (GMT+8), in time for the opening of the regular session of the 2nd Congress.

=== Martial Law and the Fourth Republic ===
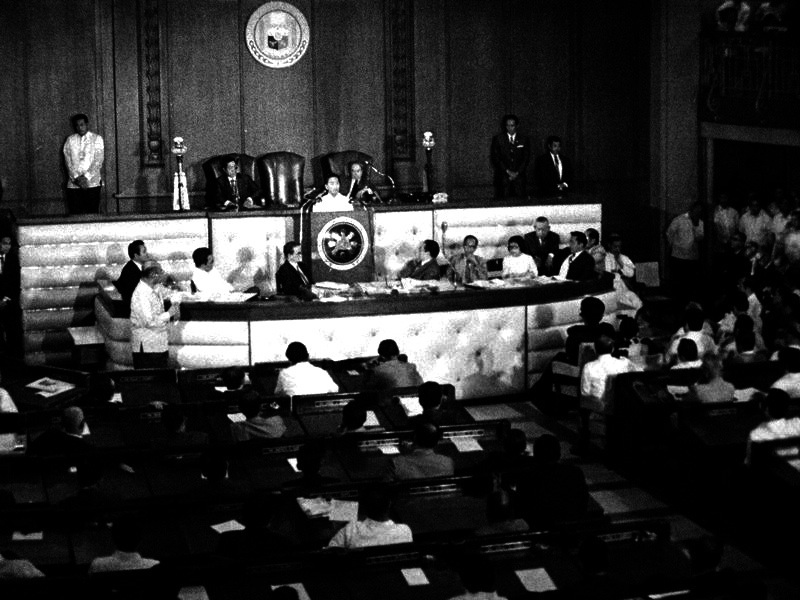
President Ferdinand Marcos delivers a speech in the 1972 SONA.

The tradition of delivering the SONA on the fourth Monday of January ended in 1972, when from 1973 to 1977, President Ferdinand E. Marcos delivered the Address every September 21—the official anniversary of his imposition of Martial Law upon the country. Since Congress was abolished with the promulgation of the 1973 Constitution, these addresses were delivered before a legislative assembly either in Malacañang Palace or at Rizal Park, except in 1976 when the address was given during the opening of the Batasang Bayan at the Philippine International Convention Center.

President Marcos began giving the Address at the Batasang Pambansa Complex on June 12, 1978 during the opening session of the Interim Batasang Pambansa. From 1979 onwards, the SONA was delivered on the fourth Monday of July, following the provisions in the 1973 Constitution and the superseding 1987 Constitution. The only exceptions to this were in 1983, when the SONA was delivered on January 17 (the anniversary of the 1973 Constitution's ratification and the second anniversary of the lifting of Martial Law), and in 1986 when President Corazón C. Aquino did not deliver any SONA following the People Power Revolution. This was because there was no legislature at the time, as the Batasang Pambansa had been dissolved and a new constitution had yet to be ratified.

=== Fifth Republic ===
With the re-establishment of Congress in 1987, President Corazon Aquino delivered her first SONA at the Plenary Hall of the Batasang Pambansa. All her successors in the office have since delivered their respective addresses in the same venue.

During Rodrigo Duterte's presidency, the broadcast of the initial five of his six addresses were supervised by filmmakers: Brillante Mendoza in 2016 and 2017, and Joyce Bernal in 2018, 2019 and 2020.

== Responses ==
The political opposition has had a response to the address, known as "kontra-SONA" (transl. counter SONA). Usually, the Minority Leader of the House of Representatives delivers the response in a session of Congress, a few days after the actual SONA. In the Senate, the kontra-SONA has been delivered more sporadically, but there were instances of it being done.

Protests are done on the day of the address itself. Protests usually occur for the second and subsequent addresses of each president, with the first address usually free from such. Protests are done at Commonwealth Avenue, Quezon City, the main road leading to the Batasang Pambansa Complex, and Mendiola Street, fronting Malacañang Palace. Leftist groups such as the Bagong Alyansang Makabayan usually burn an effigy of the sitting president as a highlight of the protest.

== Variations ==
Local chief executives also give their own addresses modeled after the State of the Nation Address. These speeches are not mandated by law, but are given usually as a matter of practice or tradition.

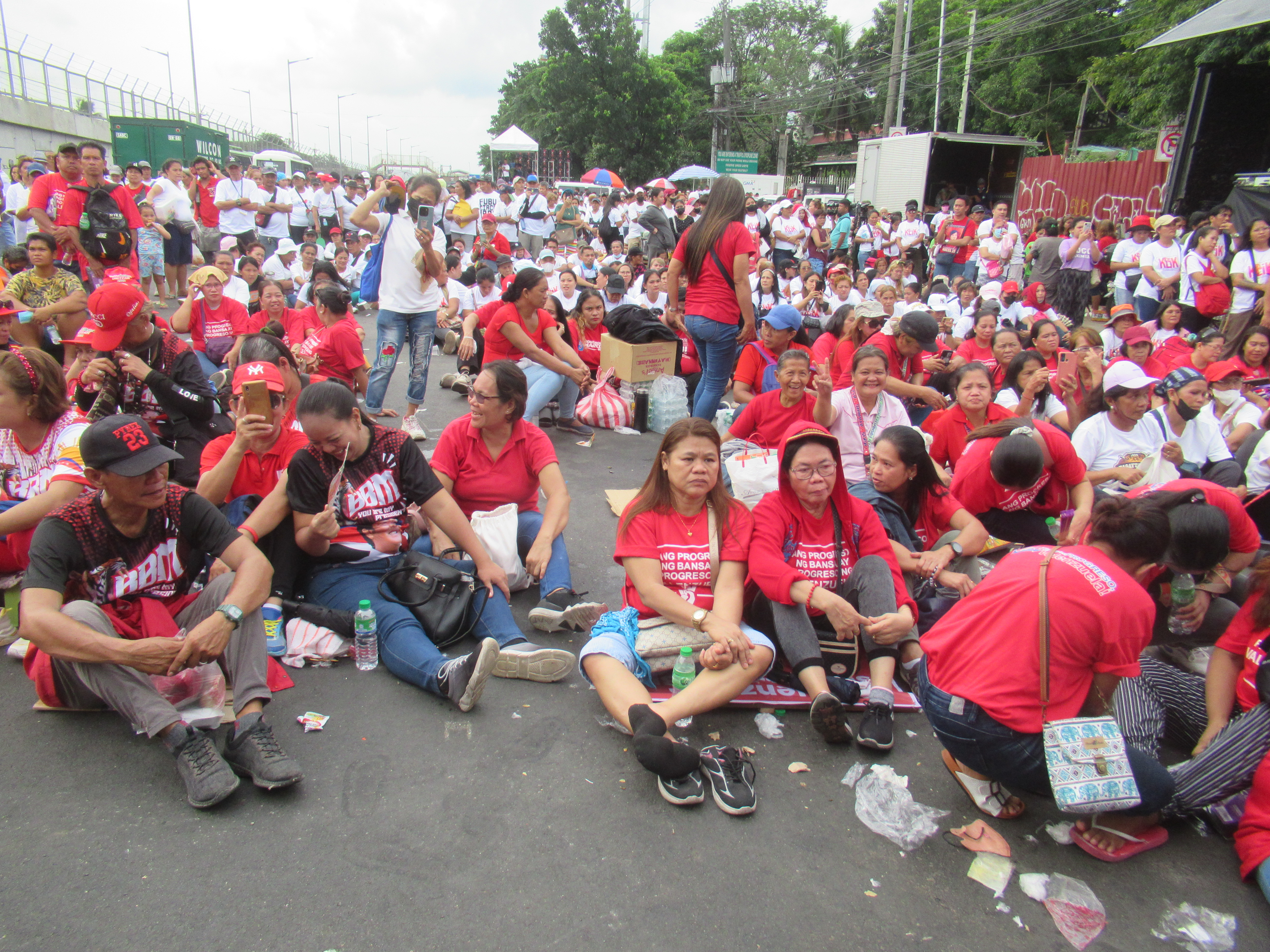
Marcos Loyalists in the 85th State of the Nation Address

- At the provincial level, the governor's speech is called a "State of the Province" Address (SOPA).
- At the civic and municipal level, this is called either a "State of the City Address" (SOCA) or "State of the Municipality" Address (SOMA), given by the mayor.
- At the barangay level, the barangay chairman speech is called a "State of the Barangay" Address (SOBA).
- It is also the practice of the Philippine Independent Church, a Christian denomination formed in the wake of the Philippine Revolution in the spirit of a national church, to release an annual "State of the Church" Address coming from the Obispo Máximo (Supreme Bishop).

== Criticism ==
Recent addresses have been the subject of criticism by various sectors for being too ostentatious and flashy, with politicians and media personalities treating the event as a red carpet fashion show, thus others dubbing it as the country's version of the Met Gala. Former Senator Miriam Defensor Santiago blasted the organizers and called the event a "thoughtless extravagance" where "peacocks spread their tails and turn around and around, as coached by media in a feeding frenzy."

Then-House speaker Pantaleon Alvarez for the 17th Congress urged representatives to dress in simple business attire for future addresses, preferably the barong tagalog for men and "short" Filipiniana for women, in preparation for President Rodrigo Duterte's first address in 2016.

== See also ==
- Government policy statement
- Singapore National Day Rally
- State of the Nation (disambiguation)
- Speech from the throne
- State Opening of Parliament in the United Kingdom
- State of the Union in the United States
