= List of joint sessions of legislatures of the Philippines =

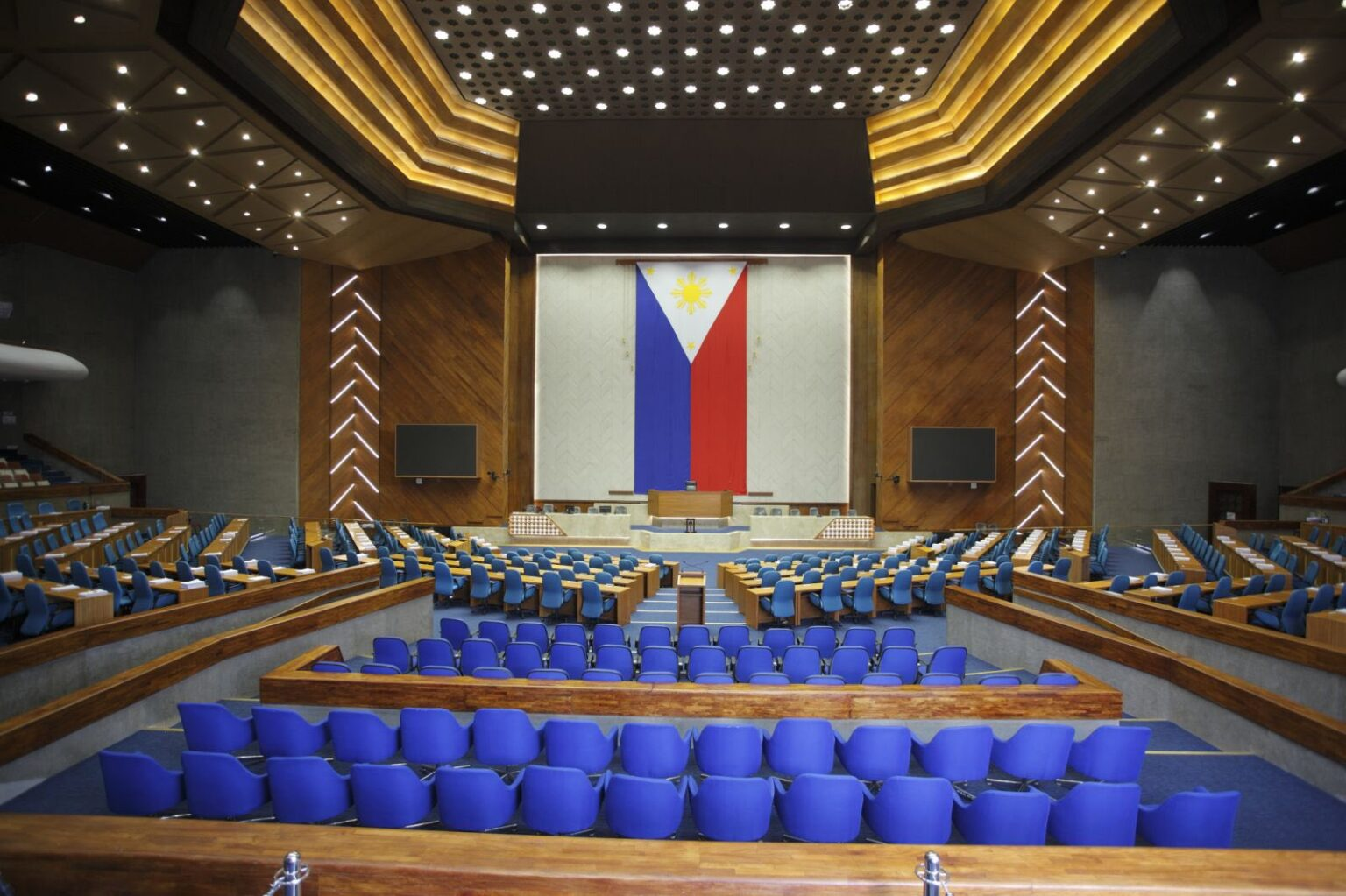
The plenary hall of the Batasang Pambansa Complex, seat of the House of Representatives and venue of joint sessions of Congress since 1987.

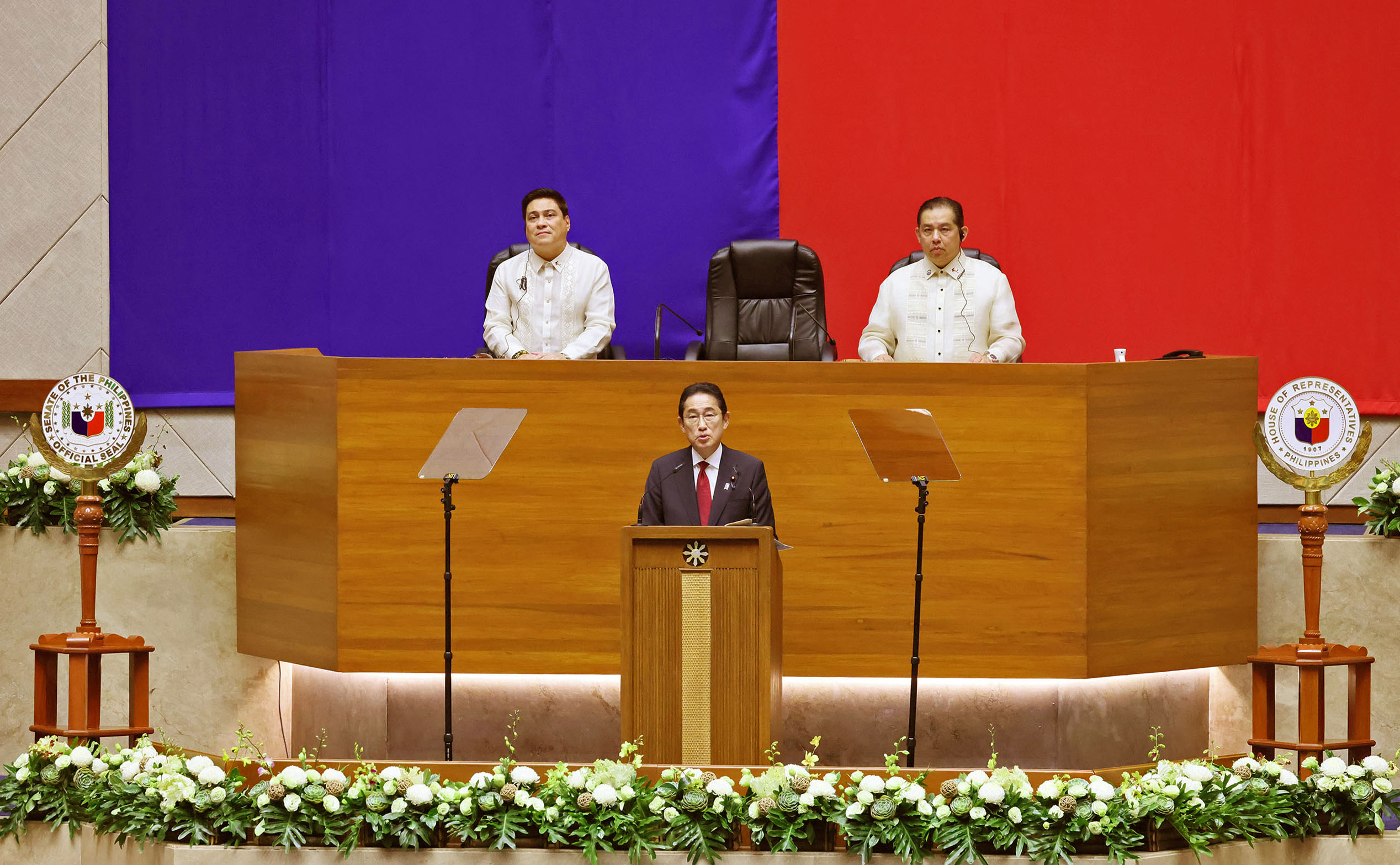
Prime Minister of Japan Fumio Kishida addressing Congress, November 4, 2023

The following is a list of joint sessions of legislatures of the Philippines, including the historical Philippine Legislature and its successor, the Congress of the Philippines. Since the establishment of an entirely elected bicameral legislature in 1916, following the creation of the Philippine Senate which replaced the Philippine Commission, joint sessions have been held with the House of Representatives (formerly the Philippine Assembly). American governor-generals and, later, Philippine presidents traditionally delivered addresses to both houses during the opening of legislative sessions.

Francis Burton Harrison was the first governor-general to deliver a message to the national legislature in 1916, following the enactment of the Jones Law creating the Philippine Senate. No joint sessions were held from 1935 to 1945 after the establishment of the unicameral National Assembly under the 1935 Constitution, and again from 1973 to 1987 after Ferdinand Marcos declared martial law and abolished Congress, with legislative powers subsequently exercised by Corazon Aquino under the provisional government following Marcos's deposition.

Legislators elected in 1941 assumed office only on June 9, 1945, after the interruption caused by World War II, with Sergio Osmeña delivering the first State of the Nation Address by a Philippine president before Congress. On six occasions, foreign heads of state or government have also addressed the Senate and the House convened jointly, the first being U.S. President Dwight D. Eisenhower in 1960.

The most recent joint session of Congress was held on July 28, 2025, during the fourth State of the Nation Address of president Bongbong Marcos. The most recent foreign dignitary to address both houses was Fumio Kishida as Prime Minister of Japan in 2023.

== Philippine Legislature (1916–1935) ==
=== 1910s ===
Legislature	Date	Occasion	Dignitary speaking	Position	Presiding officer		Location	Ref.
Legislature	Date	Occasion	Dignitary speaking	Position	Senate	House	Location	Ref.
4th Legislature	October 16, 1916	Address	Francis Burton Harrison	Governor-General of the Philippines	Manuel L. Quezon	Sergio Osmeña	Ayuntamiento de Manila	
4th Legislature	October 16, 1917	Address	Francis Burton Harrison	Governor-General of the Philippines	Manuel L. Quezon	Sergio Osmeña	Ayuntamiento de Manila	
4th Legislature	October 16, 1918	Address	Francis Burton Harrison	Governor-General of the Philippines	Manuel L. Quezon	Sergio Osmeña	Ayuntamiento de Manila	
5th Legislature	October 16, 1919	Address	Francis Burton Harrison	Governor-General of the Philippines	Manuel L. Quezon	Sergio Osmeña	Ayuntamiento de Manila	

=== 1920s ===
Legislature	Date	Occasion	Dignitary speaking	Position	Presiding officer		Location	Ref.
Legislature	Date	Occasion	Dignitary speaking	Position	Senate	House	Location	Ref.
5th Legislature	February 25, 1920	Address	Francis Burton Harrison	Governor-General of the Philippines	Manuel L. Quezon	Sergio Osmeña	Ayuntamiento de Manila	
5th Legislature	October 16, 1920	Address	Francis Burton Harrison	Governor-General of the Philippines	Manuel L. Quezon	Sergio Osmeña	Ayuntamiento de Manila	
5th Legislature	October 17, 1921	Address	Leonard Wood	Governor-General of the Philippines	Manuel L. Quezon	Sergio Osmeña	Ayuntamiento de Manila	
6th Legislature	October 27, 1922	Address	Leonard Wood	Governor-General of the Philippines	Manuel L. Quezon	Manuel Roxas	Ayuntamiento de Manila	
8th Legislature	July 16, 1928	Address	Henry L. Stimson	Governor-General of the Philippines	Manuel L. Quezon	Manuel Roxas	Legislative Building, Manila	

=== 1930s ===
Legislature	Date	Occasion	Dignitary speaking	Position	Presiding officer		Location	Ref.
Legislature	Date	Occasion	Dignitary speaking	Position	Senate	House	Location	Ref.
9th Legislature	July 16, 1931	Address	Dwight F. Davis	Governor-General of the Philippines	Manuel L. Quezon	Manuel Roxas	Legislative Building, Manila	
10th Legislature	July 16, 1934	Address	Frank Murphy	Governor-General of the Philippines	Manuel L. Quezon	Quintin Paredes	Legislative Building, Manila	
10th Legislature	November 12, 1935	Address	John Nance Garner	Vice President of the United States	Manuel L. Quezon	Quintin Paredes	Legislative Building, Manila	
10th Legislature	November 12, 1935	Address	Jo Byrns	Speaker of the United States House of Representatives	Manuel L. Quezon	Quintin Paredes	Legislative Building, Manila	

== Congress of the Commonwealth of the Philippines (1945–1946) ==
=== 1940s ===
Legislature	Date	Occasion	Dignitary speaking	Position	Presiding officer		Location	Ref.
Legislature	Date	Occasion	Dignitary speaking	Position	Senate	House	Location	Ref.
1st Congress of the Commonwealth	June 9, 1945	Address	Douglas MacArthur	Field Marshal of the Philippine Army	Manuel Roxas	Jose Zulueta	Old Japanese Schoolhouse, Lepanto, Manila	
1st Congress of the Commonwealth	June 9, 1945	State of the Nation Address	Sergio Osmeña	President of the Philippines	Manuel Roxas	Jose Zulueta	Old Japanese Schoolhouse, Lepanto, Manila	
2nd Congress of the Commonwealth	June 3, 1946	State of the Nation Address	Manuel Roxas	President of the Philippines	José Avelino	Eugenio Pérez	Old Japanese Schoolhouse, Lepanto, Manila	

== Congress of the Philippines (1946–1973; 1987–present) ==
=== 1940s ===
Legislature	Date	Occasion	Dignitary speaking	Position	Presiding officer		Location	Ref.
Legislature	Date	Occasion	Dignitary speaking	Position	Senate	House	Location	Ref.
1st Congress	January 27, 1947	State of the Nation Address	Manuel Roxas	President of the Philippines	José Avelino	Eugenio Pérez	Old Japanese Schoolhouse, Lepanto, Manila	
1st Congress	January 26, 1948	State of the Nation Address	Manuel Roxas	President of the Philippines	José Avelino	Eugenio Pérez	Old Japanese Schoolhouse, Lepanto, Manila	
1st Congress	January 24, 1949	State of the Nation Address	Elpidio Quirino	President of the Philippines	José Avelino	Eugenio Pérez	Legislative Building, Manila	

=== 1950s ===
Legislature	Date	Occasion	Dignitary speaking	Position	Presiding officer		Location	Ref.
Legislature	Date	Occasion	Dignitary speaking	Position	Senate	House	Location	Ref.
2nd Congress	January 23, 1950	State of the Nation Address	Elpidio Quirino (Note: Quirino did not personally attend the joint session as he was confined at the Johns Hopkins Hospital in Baltimore, Maryland. The address was delivered through radio broadcast to Congress who assembled at the Legislative Building in Manila.)	President of the Philippines	Mariano Jesús Cuenco	Eugenio Pérez	Legislative Building, Manila	
2nd Congress	January 23, 1951	State of the Nation Address	Elpidio Quirino	President of the Philippines	Mariano Jesús Cuenco	Domingo Veloso (Note: Presided as the speaker pro tempore.)	Legislative Building, Manila	
2nd Congress	January 28, 1952	State of the Nation Address	Elpidio Quirino	President of the Philippines	Quintín Paredes	Eugenio Pérez	Legislative Building, Manila	
2nd Congress	January 26, 1953	State of the Nation Address	Elpidio Quirino	President of the Philippines	Eulogio Rodriguez	Eugenio Pérez	Legislative Building, Manila	
3rd Congress	January 25, 1954	State of the Nation Address	Ramon Magsaysay	President of the Philippines	Eulogio Rodriguez	Jose Laurel Jr.	Legislative Building, Manila	
3rd Congress	January 24, 1955	State of the Nation Address	Ramon Magsaysay	President of the Philippines	Eulogio Rodriguez	Daniel Romualdez	Legislative Building, Manila	
3rd Congress	January 23, 1956	State of the Nation Address	Ramon Magsaysay	President of the Philippines	Eulogio Rodriguez	Jose Laurel Jr.	Legislative Building, Manila	
3rd Congress	January 28, 1957	State of the Nation Address	Ramon Magsaysay	President of the Philippines	Eulogio Rodriguez	Jose Laurel Jr.	Legislative Building, Manila	
4th Congress	January 27, 1958	State of the Nation Address	Carlos P. Garcia	President of the Philippines	Eulogio Rodriguez	Daniel Romualdez	Legislative Building, Manila	
4th Congress	January 26, 1959	State of the Nation Address	Carlos P. Garcia	President of the Philippines	Eulogio Rodriguez	Daniel Romualdez	Legislative Building, Manila	

=== 1960s ===
Legislature	Date	Occasion	Dignitary speaking	Position	Presiding officer		Location	Ref.
Legislature	Date	Occasion	Dignitary speaking	Position	Senate	House	Location	Ref.
4th Congress	January 25, 1960	State of the Nation Address	Carlos P. Garcia	President of the Philippines	Eulogio Rodriguez	Daniel Romualdez	Legislative Building, Manila	
4th Congress	June 15, 1960	Address	Dwight D. Eisenhower	President of the United States	Eulogio Rodriguez	Daniel Romualdez	Legislative Building, Manila	
4th Congress	January 23, 1961	State of the Nation Address	Carlos P. Garcia	President of the Philippines	Eulogio Rodriguez	Daniel Romualdez	Legislative Building, Manila	
5th Congress	January 22, 1962	State of the Nation Address	Diosdado Macapagal	President of the Philippines	Eulogio Rodriguez	Daniel Romualdez	Legislative Building, Manila	
5th Congress	January 28, 1963	State of the Nation Address	Diosdado Macapagal	President of the Philippines	Eulogio Rodriguez	Cornelio Villareal	Legislative Building, Manila	
5th Congress	January 27, 1964	State of the Nation Address	Diosdado Macapagal	President of the Philippines	Ferdinand Marcos	Cornelio Villareal	Legislative Building, Manila	
5th Congress	January 25, 1965	State of the Nation Address	Diosdado Macapagal	President of the Philippines	Ferdinand Marcos	Cornelio Villareal	Legislative Building, Manila	
6th Congress	January 24, 1966	State of the Nation Address	Ferdinand Marcos	President of the Philippines	Arturo Tolentino	Cornelio Villareal	Legislative Building, Manila	
6th Congress	January 23, 1967	State of the Nation Address	Ferdinand Marcos	President of the Philippines	Arturo Tolentino	Cornelio Villareal	Legislative Building, Manila	
6th Congress	January 22, 1968	State of the Nation Address	Ferdinand Marcos	President of the Philippines	Gil Puyat	Jose Laurel Jr.	Legislative Building, Manila	
6th Congress	January 27, 1969	State of the Nation Address	Ferdinand Marcos	President of the Philippines	Gil Puyat	Jose Laurel Jr.	Legislative Building, Manila	

=== 1970s ===
Legislature	Date	Occasion	Dignitary speaking	Position	Presiding officer		Location	Ref.
Legislature	Date	Occasion	Dignitary speaking	Position	Senate	House	Location	Ref.
7th Congress	January 26, 1970	State of the Nation Address	Ferdinand Marcos	President of the Philippines	Gil Puyat	Jose Laurel Jr.	Legislative Building, Manila	
7th Congress	January 25, 1971	State of the Nation Address	Ferdinand Marcos	President of the Philippines	Gil Puyat	Jose Laurel Jr.	Legislative Building, Manila	
7th Congress	January 24, 1972	State of the Nation Address	Ferdinand Marcos	President of the Philippines	Gil Puyat	Cornelio Villareal	Legislative Building, Manila	

=== 1980s ===
Legislature	Date	Occasion	Dignitary speaking	Position	Presiding officer		Location	Ref.
Legislature	Date	Occasion	Dignitary speaking	Position	Senate	House	Location	Ref.
8th Congress	July 27, 1987	State of the Nation Address	Corazon Aquino	President of the Philippines	Jovito Salonga	Ramon Mitra Jr.	Batasang Pambansa Complex, Quezon City	
8th Congress	July 25, 1988	State of the Nation Address	Corazon Aquino	President of the Philippines	Jovito Salonga	Ramon Mitra Jr.	Batasang Pambansa Complex, Quezon City	
8th Congress	July 24, 1989	State of the Nation Address	Corazon Aquino	President of the Philippines	Jovito Salonga	Ramon Mitra Jr.	Batasang Pambansa Complex, Quezon City	

=== 1990s ===
Legislature	Date	Occasion	Dignitary speaking	Position	Presiding officer		Location	Ref.
Legislature	Date	Occasion	Dignitary speaking	Position	Senate	House	Location	Ref.
8th Congress	July 23, 1990	State of the Nation Address	Corazon Aquino	President of the Philippines	Jovito Salonga	Ramon Mitra Jr.	Batasang Pambansa Complex, Quezon City	
8th Congress	July 22, 1991	State of the Nation Address	Corazon Aquino	President of the Philippines	Jovito Salonga	Ramon Mitra Jr.	Batasang Pambansa Complex, Quezon City	
8th Congress	May 26–June 16, 1992	Congressional canvass for the 1992 Philippine presidential election	None		Neptali Gonzales	Ramon Mitra Jr.	Batasang Pambansa Complex, Quezon City	
8th Congress	June 22, 1992	Proclamation of president and vice president-elect	None		Neptali Gonzales	Ramon Mitra Jr.	Batasang Pambansa Complex, Quezon City	
9th Congress	July 27, 1992	State of the Nation Address	Fidel V. Ramos	President of the Philippines	Neptali Gonzales	Jose de Venecia Jr.	Batasang Pambansa Complex, Quezon City	
9th Congress	July 26, 1993	State of the Nation Address	Fidel V. Ramos	President of the Philippines	Edgardo Angara	Jose de Venecia Jr.	Batasang Pambansa Complex, Quezon City	
9th Congress	July 25, 1994	State of the Nation Address	Fidel V. Ramos	President of the Philippines	Edgardo Angara	Jose de Venecia Jr.	Batasang Pambansa Complex, Quezon City	
10th Congress	July 24, 1995	State of the Nation Address	Fidel V. Ramos	President of the Philippines	Edgardo Angara	Jose de Venecia Jr.	Batasang Pambansa Complex, Quezon City	
10th Congress	July 22, 1996	State of the Nation Address	Fidel V. Ramos	President of the Philippines	Neptali Gonzales	Jose de Venecia Jr.	Batasang Pambansa Complex, Quezon City	
10th Congress	July 28, 1997	State of the Nation Address	Fidel V. Ramos	President of the Philippines	Ernesto Maceda	Jose de Venecia Jr.	Batasang Pambansa Complex, Quezon City	
10th Congress	May 27–28, 1998	Congressional canvass for the 1998 Philippine presidential election	None		Neptali Gonzales	Jose de Venecia Jr.	Batasang Pambansa Complex, Quezon City	
10th Congress	May 29, 1998	Proclamation of president and vice president-elect	None		Neptali Gonzales	Jose de Venecia Jr.	Batasang Pambansa Complex, Quezon City	
11th Congress	July 27, 1998	State of the Nation Address	Joseph Estrada	President of the Philippines	Marcelo Fernan	Manny Villar	Batasang Pambansa Complex, Quezon City	
11th Congress	July 26, 1999	State of the Nation Address	Joseph Estrada	President of the Philippines	Blas Ople	Manny Villar	Batasang Pambansa Complex, Quezon City	

=== 2000s ===
Legislature	Date	Occasion	Dignitary speaking	Position	Presiding officer		Location	Ref.
Legislature	Date	Occasion	Dignitary speaking	Position	Senate	House	Location	Ref.
11th Congress	July 24, 2000	State of the Nation Address	Joseph Estrada	President of the Philippines	Franklin Drilon	Manny Villar	Batasang Pambansa Complex, Quezon City	
12th Congress	July 23, 2001	State of the Nation Address	Gloria Macapagal Arroyo	President of the Philippines	Franklin Drilon	Jose de Venecia Jr.	Batasang Pambansa Complex, Quezon City	
12th Congress	July 22, 2002	State of the Nation Address	Gloria Macapagal Arroyo	President of the Philippines	Franklin Drilon	Jose de Venecia Jr.	Batasang Pambansa Complex, Quezon City	
12th Congress	July 28, 2003	State of the Nation Address	Gloria Macapagal Arroyo	President of the Philippines	Franklin Drilon	Jose de Venecia Jr.	Batasang Pambansa Complex, Quezon City	
12th Congress	October 18, 2003	Address	George W. Bush	President of the United States	Franklin Drilon	Jose de Venecia Jr.	Batasang Pambansa Complex, Quezon City	
12th Congress	May 11–June 20, 2004	Congressional canvass for the 2004 Philippine presidential election	None		Franklin Drilon	Jose de Venecia Jr.	Batasang Pambansa Complex, Quezon City	
12th Congress	June 20, 2004	Proclamation of president and vice president-elect	None		Franklin Drilon	Jose de Venecia Jr.	Batasang Pambansa Complex, Quezon City	
13th Congress	July 26, 2004	State of the Nation Address	Gloria Macapagal Arroyo	President of the Philippines	Franklin Drilon	Jose de Venecia Jr.	Batasang Pambansa Complex, Quezon City	
13th Congress	April 19, 2005	Address	Pervez Musharraf	President of Pakistan	Franklin Drilon	Jose de Venecia Jr.	Batasang Pambansa Complex, Quezon City	
13th Congress	April 27, 2005	Address	Hu Jintao	President of China	Franklin Drilon	Jose de Venecia Jr.	Batasang Pambansa Complex, Quezon City	
13th Congress	July 25, 2005	State of the Nation Address	Gloria Macapagal Arroyo	President of the Philippines	Franklin Drilon	Jose de Venecia Jr.	Batasang Pambansa Complex, Quezon City	
13th Congress	February 6, 2006	Address	A. P. J. Abdul Kalam	President of India	Franklin Drilon	Jose de Venecia Jr.	Batasang Pambansa Complex, Quezon City	
13th Congress	July 24, 2006	State of the Nation Address	Gloria Macapagal Arroyo	President of the Philippines	Manny Villar	Jose de Venecia Jr.	Batasang Pambansa Complex, Quezon City	
14th Congress	July 23, 2007	State of the Nation Address	Gloria Macapagal Arroyo	President of the Philippines	Manny Villar	Jose de Venecia Jr.	Batasang Pambansa Complex, Quezon City	
14th Congress	July 28, 2008	State of the Nation Address	Gloria Macapagal Arroyo	President of the Philippines	Manny Villar	Prospero Nograles	Batasang Pambansa Complex, Quezon City	
14th Congress	July 27, 2009	State of the Nation Address	Gloria Macapagal Arroyo	President of the Philippines	Juan Ponce Enrile	Prospero Nograles	Batasang Pambansa Complex, Quezon City	

=== 2010s ===
Legislature	Date	Occasion	Dignitary speaking	Position	Presiding officer		Location	Ref.
Legislature	Date	Occasion	Dignitary speaking	Position	Senate	House	Location	Ref.
14th Congress	May 25–June 9, 2010	Congressional canvass for the 2010 Philippine presidential election	None		Juan Ponce Enrile	Prospero Nograles	Batasang Pambansa Complex, Quezon City	
14th Congress	June 9, 2010	Proclamation of president and vice president-elect	None		Juan Ponce Enrile	Prospero Nograles	Batasang Pambansa Complex, Quezon City	
15th Congress	July 26, 2010	State of the Nation Address	Benigno Aquino III	President of the Philippines	Juan Ponce Enrile	Feliciano Belmonte Jr.	Batasang Pambansa Complex, Quezon City	
15th Congress	July 25, 2011	State of the Nation Address	Benigno Aquino III	President of the Philippines	Juan Ponce Enrile	Feliciano Belmonte Jr.	Batasang Pambansa Complex, Quezon City	
15th Congress	July 23, 2012	State of the Nation Address	Benigno Aquino III	President of the Philippines	Juan Ponce Enrile	Feliciano Belmonte Jr.	Batasang Pambansa Complex, Quezon City	
16th Congress	July 22, 2013	State of the Nation Address	Benigno Aquino III	President of the Philippines	Franklin Drilon	Feliciano Belmonte Jr.	Batasang Pambansa Complex, Quezon City	
16th Congress	July 28, 2014	State of the Nation Address	Benigno Aquino III	President of the Philippines	Franklin Drilon	Feliciano Belmonte Jr.	Batasang Pambansa Complex, Quezon City	
16th Congress	July 27, 2015	State of the Nation Address	Benigno Aquino III	President of the Philippines	Franklin Drilon	Feliciano Belmonte Jr.	Batasang Pambansa Complex, Quezon City	
16th Congress	May 25–27, 2016	Congressional canvass for the 2016 Philippine presidential election	None		Franklin Drilon	Feliciano Belmonte Jr.	Batasang Pambansa Complex, Quezon City	
16th Congress	May 30, 2016	Proclamation of president and vice president-elect	None		Franklin Drilon	Feliciano Belmonte Jr.	Batasang Pambansa Complex, Quezon City	
17th Congress	July 25, 2016	State of the Nation Address	Rodrigo Duterte	President of the Philippines	Koko Pimentel	Pantaleon Alvarez	Batasang Pambansa Complex, Quezon City	
17th Congress	July 22–23, 2017	Extension of the proclamation of martial law	None		Koko Pimentel	Pantaleon Alvarez	Batasang Pambansa Complex, Quezon City	
17th Congress	July 24, 2017	State of the Nation Address	Rodrigo Duterte	President of the Philippines	Koko Pimentel	Pantaleon Alvarez	Batasang Pambansa Complex, Quezon City	
17th Congress	December 13, 2017	Extension of the proclamation of martial law	None		Koko Pimentel	Pantaleon Alvarez	Batasang Pambansa Complex, Quezon City	
17th Congress	July 23, 2018	State of the Nation Address	Rodrigo Duterte	President of the Philippines	Tito Sotto	Pantaleon Alvarez	Batasang Pambansa Complex, Quezon City	
17th Congress	December 12, 2018	Extension of the proclamation of martial law	None		Tito Sotto	Gloria Macapagal Arroyo	Batasang Pambansa Complex, Quezon City	
18th Congress	July 22, 2019	State of the Nation Address	Rodrigo Duterte	President of the Philippines	Tito Sotto	Alan Peter Cayetano	Batasang Pambansa Complex, Quezon City	

=== 2020s ===
Legislature	Date	Occasion	Dignitary speaking	Position	Presiding officer		Location	Ref.
Legislature	Date	Occasion	Dignitary speaking	Position	Senate	House	Location	Ref.
18th Congress	July 27, 2020	State of the Nation Address	Rodrigo Duterte	President of the Philippines	Tito Sotto	Alan Peter Cayetano	Batasang Pambansa Complex, Quezon City	
18th Congress	July 26, 2021	State of the Nation Address	Rodrigo Duterte	President of the Philippines	Tito Sotto	Lord Allan Velasco	Batasang Pambansa Complex, Quezon City	
18th Congress	May 24–25, 2022	Congressional canvass for the 2022 Philippine presidential election	None		Tito Sotto	Lord Allan Velasco	Batasang Pambansa Complex, Quezon City	
18th Congress	May 25, 2022	Proclamation of president and vice president-elect	None		Tito Sotto	Lord Allan Velasco	Batasang Pambansa Complex, Quezon City	
19th Congress	July 25, 2022	State of the Nation Address	Bongbong Marcos	President of the Philippines	Juan Miguel Zubiri	Martin Romualdez	Batasang Pambansa Complex, Quezon City	
19th Congress	July 24, 2023	State of the Nation Address	Bongbong Marcos	President of the Philippines	Juan Miguel Zubiri	Martin Romualdez	Batasang Pambansa Complex, Quezon City	
19th Congress	November 4, 2023	Address	Fumio Kishida	Prime Minister of Japan	Juan Miguel Zubiri	Martin Romualdez	Batasang Pambansa Complex, Quezon City	
19th Congress	July 22, 2024	State of the Nation Address	Bongbong Marcos	President of the Philippines	Francis Escudero	Martin Romualdez	Batasang Pambansa Complex, Quezon City	
20th Congress	July 28, 2025	State of the Nation Address	Bongbong Marcos	President of the Philippines	Francis Escudero	Martin Romualdez	Batasang Pambansa Complex, Quezon City	
20th Congress	July 27, 2026	State of the Nation Address	Bongbong Marcos	President of the Philippines	Sherwin Gatchalian	Bojie Dy	Batasang Pambansa Complex, Quezon City	

=== Upcoming joint sessions ===
Legislature	Date	Occasion	Dignitary speaking	Position	Presiding officer		Location
Legislature	Date	Occasion	Dignitary speaking	Position	Senate	House	Location
20th Congress	July 26, 2027	State of the Nation Address	Bongbong Marcos	President of the Philippines	TBD		Batasang Pambansa Complex, Quezon City

== See also ==
- State of the Nation Address (Philippines)
