= 1985 State of the Nation Address (Philippines) =

State of the Nation Address of the Philippines

1985 Message on the State of the Nation
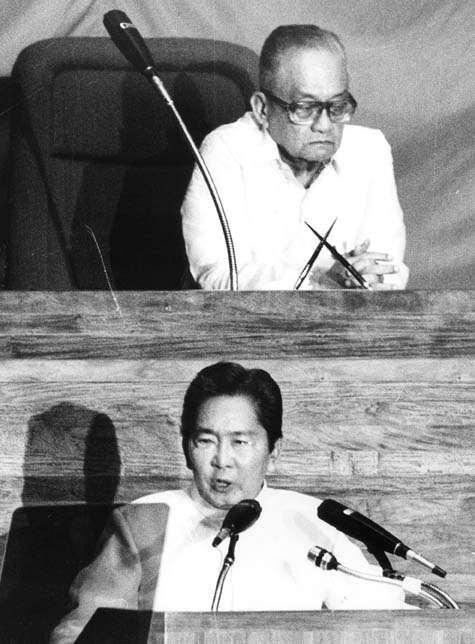
- President Ferdinand Marcos (foreground) delivers his 20th State of the Nation Address; Batasan speaker Nicanor Yñiguez is seated behind him.
- Date: July 22, 1985
- Venue: Session Hall, Batasang Pambansa Complex
- Location: Quezon City, Philippines; 14°41′36″N 121°5′40″E
- Participants: Ferdinand Marcos; Nicanor Yñiguez
- Languages: English
- Previous: 1984 State of the Nation Address
- Next: 1987 State of the Nation Address

The 1985 Message on the State of the Nation, entitled "A Turning Point for the Nation", was the 20th and last State of the Nation Address (SONA) delivered by Ferdinand Marcos, the 10th president of the Philippines, on July 22, 1985, at the Batasang Pambansa Complex.

Speaker Nicanor Yñiguez presided over the opening of the second regular session of the Regular Batasang Pambansa.

President Marcos centered his address on the government's response to the economic and political challenges following the 1983 assassination of former senator Ninoy Aquino. He reported improvements in inflation, employment, foreign reserves, and the balance of payments, attributing these gains to the government's economic recovery program and cooperation with international financial institutions. Marcos also presented measures to promote agricultural and industrial development, fiscal discipline, export growth, and structural economic reforms. Marcos closed the address by calling for national unity and support from the Batasang Pambansa and the public for his regime's efforts to achieve economic recovery, political stability, and modernization.

== Aftermath ==
On November 4, 1985, Marcos was interviewed on the ABC News program This Week with David Brinkley, during which he unexpectedly announced that he would hold a snap election on February 7, 1986, instead of in 1987 as originally scheduled. The widow of Ninoy Aquino, Corazon Aquino, was nominated by the opposition coalition UNIDO to challenge Marcos, who ran under the banner of his party, Kilusang Bagong Lipunan.

Marcos was declared by the Batasan as the winner of the election amid allegations of voter fraud and irregularities. Aquino questioned the legitimacy of the results after the election watchdog National Citizens' Movement for Free Elections (NAMFREL) reported a count indicating Aquino's victory. A series of mass demonstrations and acts of civil disobedience, later known as the People Power Revolution, led to Marcos's ouster and flight from the country and Aquino's assumption of office as president on February 25, 1986.

A State of the Nation Address would not be delivered again until 1987, when President Aquino addressed the reestablished bicameral Congress.

Preceded by 1984 State of the Nation Address	State of the Nation Address; 1985	Succeeded by 1987 State of the Nation Address
