= 1991 State of the Nation Address (Philippines) =

State of the Nation Address of the Philippines

1991 The State of the Nation Message
- Full video of the speech as published by Radio Television Malacañang
- Date: July 22, 1991
- Venue: Session Hall, Batasang Pambansa Complex
- Location: Quezon City, Philippines; 14°41′36″N 121°5′40″E
- Filmed by: Radio Television Malacañang
- Participants: Corazon Aquino; Jovito Salonga; Ramon Mitra Jr.
- Languages: English
- Previous: 1990 State of the Nation Address
- Next: 1992 State of the Nation Address

The 1991 The State of the Nation Message was the fifth and last State of the Nation Address (SONA) delivered by Corazon Aquino, the 11th president of the Philippines, on July 22, 1991, at the Batasang Pambansa Complex.

The joint session was presided over by Senate President Jovito Salonga and House Speaker Ramon Mitra Jr.

Aquino's final address to Congress focused on the challenges and accomplishments of her administration during its final year in office. She discussed the impact of recent natural disasters, including the 1990 Luzon earthquake and the 1991 eruption of Mount Pinatubo, as well as the economic and political disruptions caused by several coup attempts and the Gulf War. Aquino highlighted advances in education, agrarian reform, environmental protection, health care, housing, and participatory democracy, while emphasizing the resilience of democratic institutions amid numerous crises. She also reaffirmed her commitment to free and fair elections and underscored the importance of a peaceful transfer of power in 1992, describing it as a defining achievement of Philippine democracy.

Aquino was eligible for re-election in 1992, having been inaugurated before the ratification of the present Constitution, but declined to seek another term. Salonga and Mitra went on to become candidates in the 1992 presidential election but lost to Aquino-endorsed AFP Chief of Staff Fidel V. Ramos.

Preceded by 1990 State of the Nation Address	State of the Nation Address; 1991	Succeeded by 1992 State of the Nation Address
