= 1990 State of the Nation Address (Philippines) =

State of the Nation Address of the Philippines

1990 Message to the Congress
- Full video of the speech as published by Radio Television Malacañang
- Date: July 23, 1990
- Venue: Session Hall, Batasang Pambansa Complex
- Location: Quezon City, Philippines; 14°41′36″N 121°5′40″E
- Filmed by: Radio Television Malacañang
- Participants: Corazon Aquino; Jovito Salonga; Ramon Mitra Jr.
- Languages: English
- Previous: 1989 State of the Nation Address
- Next: 1991 State of the Nation Address

The 1990 Message to the Congress was the fourth State of the Nation Address (SONA) delivered by Corazon Aquino, the 11th president of the Philippines, on July 23, 1990, at the Batasang Pambansa Complex.

The joint session was presided over by Senate President Jovito Salonga and House Speaker Ramon Mitra Jr.

Aquino's address highlighted the country's recovery from the 1990 Luzon earthquake and the progress achieved during the first four years of her administration. She highlighted economic growth, increased foreign investment, infrastructure development, agrarian and rural development programs, and efforts to strengthen democratic institutions following the unsuccessful December 1989 coup attempt. Aquino also emphasized environmental protection, local autonomy, tax reform, youth participation in nation-building, and the establishment of autonomous regions in Muslim Mindanao and the Cordilleras. The address concluded with a call for national unity, as with her previous SONAs, and legislative support for measures focusing on economic development, environmental conservation, and democratic governance.

Preceded by 1989 State of the Nation Address	State of the Nation Address; 1990	Succeeded by 1991 State of the Nation Address
