= 1992 State of the Nation Address (Philippines) =

State of the Nation Address of the Philippines

1992 Message to the Congress on the State of the Nation
- Full video of the speech as published by Radio Television Malacañang
- Date: July 27, 1992
- Venue: Session Hall, Batasang Pambansa Complex
- Location: Quezon City, Philippines; 14°41′36″N 121°5′40″E
- Filmed by: Radio Television Malacañang
- Participants: Fidel V. Ramos; Neptali Gonzales; Jose de Venecia Jr.
- Languages: English
- Previous: 1991 State of the Nation Address
- Next: 1993 State of the Nation Address

The 1992 Message to the Congress on the State of the Nation, entitled "Reform, Change and Growth", was the first State of the Nation Address (SONA) delivered by Fidel V. Ramos, the 12th president of the Philippines, on July 27, 1992, at the Batasang Pambansa Complex.

The joint session was presided over by Senate President Neptali Gonzales and House Speaker Jose de Venecia Jr.

Ramos, who had been elected in 1992 to succeed Corazon Aquino, addressed Congress on his administration's formula entitled "Philippines 2000", a national development program aimed at achieving economic growth, political stability, and global competitiveness by the end of the millennium. He identified peace and security, poverty alleviation, government reform, and economic modernization as the country's most pressing priorities. Ramos called for measures to address insurgency and criminality, including the granting of amnesty to former Communist Party of the Philippines–New People's Army (CPP–NPA) and Moro National Liberation Front (MNLF) rebels and the strengthening of law enforcement. He also advocated for decentralization, privatization, bureaucratic reform, increased private-sector participation, and policies to promote investment and job creation. Ramos ended the address by emphasizing the value of national unity, collective responsibility, and sustained reform to achieve long-term growth and development.

== See also ==
- 1992 Philippine presidential election

Preceded by 1991 State of the Nation Address	State of the Nation Address; 1992	Succeeded by 1993 State of the Nation Address
