= 1988 State of the Nation Address (Philippines) =

State of the Nation Address of the Philippines

1988 State of the Nation Message
- Full video of the speech as published by Radio Television Malacañang
- Date: July 25, 1988
- Venue: Session Hall, Batasang Pambansa Complex
- Location: Quezon City, Philippines; 14°41′36″N 121°5′40″E
- Filmed by: Radio Television Malacañang
- Participants: Corazon Aquino; Jovito Salonga; Ramon Mitra Jr.
- Languages: English
- Previous: 1987 State of the Nation Address
- Next: 1989 State of the Nation Address

The 1988 State of the Nation Message was the second State of the Nation Address (SONA) delivered by Corazon Aquino, the 11th president of the Philippines, on July 25, 1988, at the Batasang Pambansa Complex.

The joint session was presided over by Senate President Jovito Salonga and House Speaker Ramon Mitra Jr.

Aquino's address focused on the progress made in restoring democratic governance and economic stability following the transition from the authoritarian rule of former president Ferdinand Marcos. She reported improvements in economic growth, employment, industrial activity, and investor confidence, attributing these gains to democratic reforms and increased private-sector participation. Aquino also discussed decentralization efforts, debt reduction, education, job creation, poverty alleviation, and the implementation of the Comprehensive Agrarian Reform Program. On national security, she highlighted government successes against the communist insurgency and reflected on the August 1987 coup attempt, reaffirming her administration's commitment to national reconciliation, democratic institutions, and the rule of law. The address concluded with a call for national unity and a renewed sense of purpose in sustaining the gains of the People Power Revolution.

Preceded by 1987 State of the Nation Address	State of the Nation Address; 1988	Succeeded by 1989 State of the Nation Address
