= 1989 State of the Nation Address (Philippines) =

State of the Nation Address of the Philippines

1989 Message to the Congress
- Full video of the speech as published by Radio Television Malacañang
- Date: July 24, 1989
- Venue: Session Hall, Batasang Pambansa Complex
- Location: Quezon City, Philippines; 14°41′36″N 121°5′40″E
- Filmed by: Radio Television Malacañang
- Participants: Corazon Aquino; Jovito Salonga; Ramon Mitra Jr.
- Languages: English
- Previous: 1988 State of the Nation Address
- Next: 1990 State of the Nation Address

The 1989 Message to the Congress was the third State of the Nation Address (SONA) delivered by Corazon Aquino, the 11th president of the Philippines, on July 24, 1989, at the Batasang Pambansa Complex.

The joint session was presided over by Senate President Jovito Salonga and House Speaker Ramon Mitra Jr.

Aquino's message served as a midterm assessment of the government's accomplishments and challenges since her assumption of office in 1986. She emphasized economic recovery, increased investments, job creation, and the restoration of democratic institutions while recognizing the presence of widespread poverty despite these gains. Aquino also outlined measures on agrarian reform, rural development, decentralization, environmental protection, tax reform, and anti-corruption efforts. On national security, she reported significant progress against communist insurgency and reflected on the need to strengthen law enforcement, protect human rights, and maintain public order. Aquino ended her address with a call for sustained economic growth, effective governance, and support for the 1990 national budget to address social and economic challenges.

Preceded by 1988 State of the Nation Address	State of the Nation Address; 1989	Succeeded by 1990 State of the Nation Address
