= 1987 State of the Nation Address (Philippines) =

State of the Nation Address of the Philippines

1987 The State of the Nation Message
- Full video of the speech as published by Radio Television Malacañang
- Date: July 27, 1987
- Venue: Session Hall, Batasang Pambansa Complex
- Location: Quezon City, Philippines; 14°41′36″N 121°5′40″E
- Filmed by: Radio Television Malacañang
- Participants: Corazon Aquino; Jovito Salonga; Ramon Mitra Jr.
- Languages: English
- Previous: 1985 State of the Nation Address
- Next: 1988 State of the Nation Address

The 1987 The State of the Nation Message was the first State of the Nation Address (SONA) delivered by Corazon Aquino, the 11th president of the Philippines, on July 27, 1987, at the Batasang Pambansa Complex.

The address marked the official reopening of the bicameral Congress following its abolition in 1973 during the presidency of Ferdinand Marcos. The joint session was presided over by Senate President Jovito Salonga and House Speaker Ramon Mitra Jr.

In her address, Aquino focused on the restoration of democratic governance following the People Power Revolution and the ratification of the 1987 Constitution. She outlined her administration's efforts to revive the Philippine economy, strengthen democratic institutions, implement social reforms, and address the political and security challenges facing the newly established Fifth Republic. Aquino received 80 rounds of applause during her speech.

== See also ==
- 1986 Philippine presidential election

Preceded by 1985 State of the Nation Address	State of the Nation Address; 1987	Succeeded by 1988 State of the Nation Address
