= Congressional canvass for the 1992 Philippine presidential election =

The following is the official canvassing of votes by the Congress of the Philippines for the 1992 Philippine presidential and vice presidential election. The canvassing started on May 26, 1992 and finished on June 16, 1992.

== Process ==
After voters had finished voting, the board of election inspectors per precinct then count the votes received by each candidate in each position. For positions elected on a national basis (president, vice president, and senators), an election return for that precinct will be submitted to the municipal/city board of canvassers, Congress, Commission on Elections, the citizen's arm authorized by the commission, political parties, and others.

The city or municipality will then tally the votes in the election returns for all positions and will issue two documents at its conclusion: a statement of votes where the votes obtained by candidates in each precinct in a city/municipality is stated; and a certificate of canvass (COC), a document containing the total votes in figures obtained by each candidate in the city or municipality. The city or municipal COC will be sent to Congress (if the city is an Independent city with its own legislative district) or to the provincial board of canvassers in which the process is repeated; this time the provincial COC will be sent to Congress.

Congress, seating as the National Board of Canvassers, will canvass the votes to determine who among the candidates are elected president and vice president.

In theory, all of the votes from the election returns when added must be equal to the votes canvassed by Congress coming from the city/provincial COCs.

== Members of the canvassing committee ==
Instead of the whole Congress canvassing the votes, a committee comprised evenly between the Senate and the House of Representatives will canvass the votes at the Batasang Pambansa Complex in Quezon City, the home of the House of Representatives.

| Senate | Position | House of Representatives |
|---|---|---|
| Senate Minority Leader Wigberto Tañada (Liberal) | Co-chairpersons | House Majority Leader Ronaldo Zamora (KBL, San Juan–Mandaluyong) |
| Senate President Neptali Gonzales (LDP); Senate Majority Leader Alberto Romulo (LDP); Vicente Paterno (PDP–Laban); Leticia Ramos-Shahani (LDP); Sotero Laurel (UNIDO); Ernesto Maceda (PDP–Laban) | Members | Edelmiro Amante (Nacionalista, 2nd district Agusan del Norte); Gerardo Cabochan (PDP–Laban, 2nd district Caloocan); Raul Daza (Liberal, 1st district Northern Samar); Milagros Laurel-Trinidad (Nacionalista, 3rd district Batangas); Roque Ablan Jr. (KBL, 1st district Ilocos Norte); Victor Ortega (Nacionalista/KBL, 1st district La Union) |

Members of Congress who ran for president (Ramon Mitra Jr. and Jovito Salonga) and vice president (Aquilino Pimentel Jr. and Joseph Estrada) are banned from attending the proceedings.

Each political party is entitled to two lawyers who may file motions before Congress.

== Presidential election ==
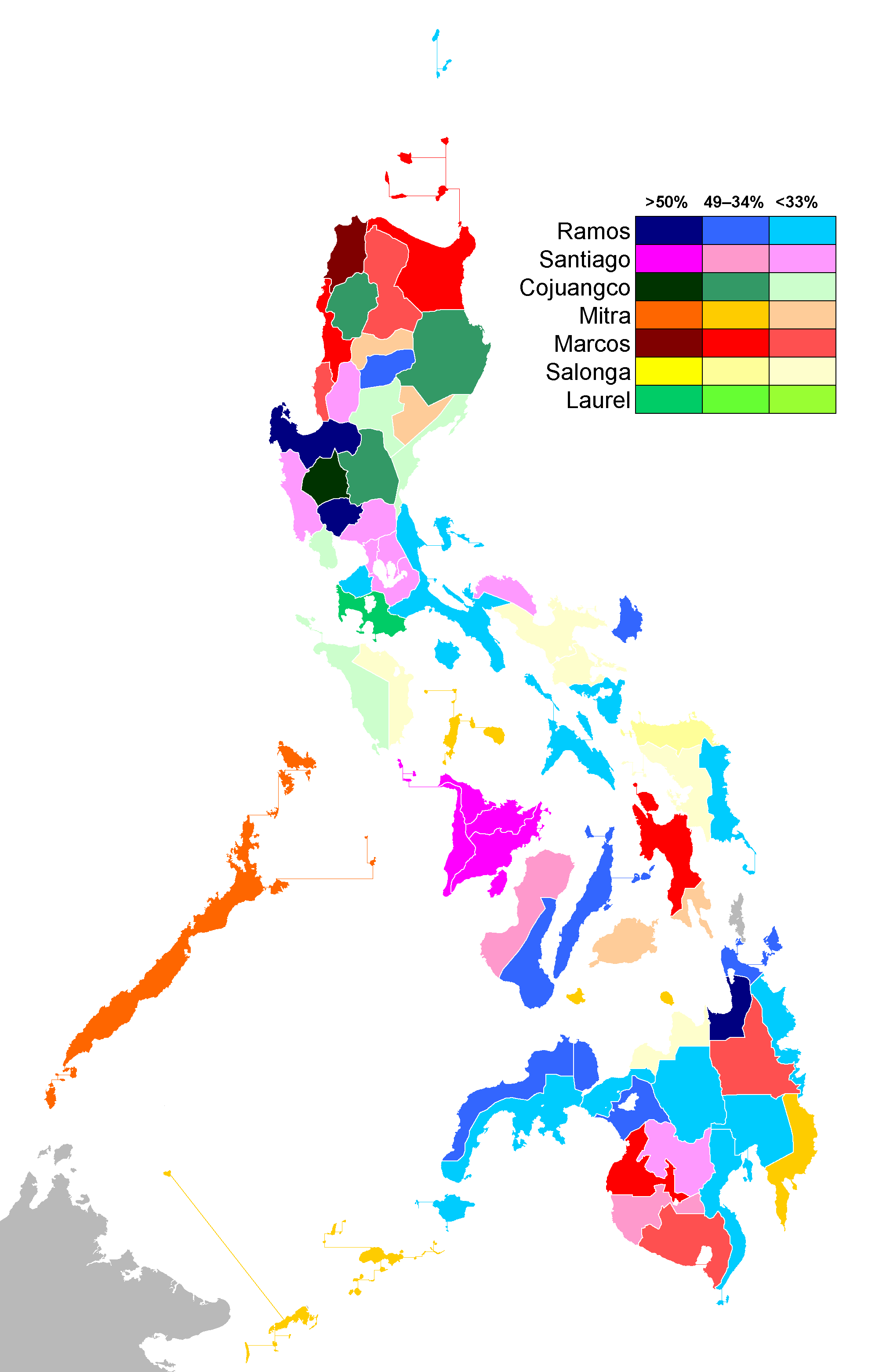
Detailed results per province.

| Candidate | Party | Votes | % |
|---|---|---|---|
| Fidel V. Ramos | Lakas–NUCD | 5,342,521 | 23.58 |
| Miriam Defensor Santiago | People's Reform Party | 4,468,173 | 19.72 |
| Danding Cojuangco | Nationalist People's Coalition | 4,116,376 | 18.17 |
| Ramon Mitra Jr. | Laban ng Demokratikong Pilipino | 3,316,661 | 14.64 |
| Imelda Marcos | Kilusang Bagong Lipunan | 2,338,294 | 10.32 |
| Jovito Salonga | Liberal Party | 2,302,124 | 10.16 |
| Salvador Laurel | Nacionalista Party | 770,046 | 3.40 |
| Total | | 22,654,195 | 100.00 |
| Valid votes | | 22,654,195 | 93.40 |
| Invalid/blank votes | | 1,600,759 | 6.60 |
| Total votes | | 24,254,954 | 100.00 |
| Registered voters/turnout | | 32,141,079 | 75.46 |
Source: Nohlen, Grotz, Hartmann, Hasall and Santos

| Region | Ramos | | Santiago | | Cojuangco | | Mitra | | Marcos | | Salonga | | Laurel | |
| Region | Votes | % | Votes | % | Votes | % | Votes | % | Votes | % | Votes | % | Votes | % |
|---|---|---|---|---|---|---|---|---|---|---|---|---|---|---|
| Abra | 6,909 | 8.48 | 4,155 | 5.10 | 32,280 | 39.60 | 4,422 | 5.42 | 31,566 | 38.72 | 1,962 | 2.41 | 226 | 0.28 |
| Agusan del Norte | 76,437 | 41.89 | 10,589 | 5.80 | 17,032 | 9.33 | 29,526 | 16.18 | 26,743 | 14.66 | 20,601 | 11.29 | 1,555 | 0.85 |
| Agusan del Sur | 18,071 | 14.07 | 9,008 | 7.01 | 20,038 | 15.60 | 25,070 | 19.52 | 27,571 | 21.46 | 27,163 | 21.14 | 1,543 | 1.20 |
| Aklan | 18,346 | 11.99 | 90,335 | 59.02 | 19,383 | 12.66 | 18,074 | 11.81 | 2,294 | 1.50 | 3,348 | 2.19 | 1,281 | 0.84 |
| Albay | 54,334 | 16.68 | 54,263 | 16.66 | 62,971 | 19.33 | 62,488 | 19.18 | 3,293 | 1.01 | 79,051 | 24.27 | 9,371 | 2.88 |
| Antique | 30,031 | 20.69 | 76,138 | 52.47 | 10,800 | 7.44 | 15,796 | 10.88 | 5,912 | 4.07 | 4,475 | 3.08 | 1,967 | 1.36 |
| Aurora | 10,574 | 20.39 | 6,965 | 13.43 | 13,429 | 25.90 | 8,309 | 16.02 | 5,708 | 11.01 | 6,047 | 11.66 | 819 | 1.58 |
| Bacolod | 32,981 | 22.61 | 77,939 | 53.42 | 14,824 | 10.16 | 9,978 | 6.84 | 2,096 | 1.44 | 6,427 | 4.41 | 1,653 | 1.13 |
| Baguio | 10,668 | 14.35 | 23,486 | 31.59 | 19,759 | 26.58 | 5,073 | 6.82 | 6,809 | 9.16 | 7,196 | 9.68 | 1,351 | 1.82 |
| Basilan | 8,917 | 21.91 | 8,826 | 21.69 | 5,304 | 13.04 | 6,757 | 16.61 | 2,182 | 5.36 | 7,241 | 17.80 | 1,463 | 3.60 |
| Bataan | 36,424 | 18.93 | 44,132 | 22.93 | 59,099 | 30.71 | 18,351 | 9.54 | 12,464 | 6.48 | 20,577 | 10.69 | 1,378 | 0.72 |
| Batanes | 1,632 | 28.17 | 1,051 | 18.14 | 976 | 16.85 | 647 | 11.17 | 83 | 1.43 | 1,358 | 23.44 | 47 | 0.81 |
| Batangas | 58,763 | 9.56 | 50,050 | 8.14 | 37,630 | 6.12 | 53,971 | 8.78 | 8,414 | 1.37 | 19,214 | 3.13 | 386,646 | 62.90 |
| Benguet | 21,633 | 21.21 | 24,768 | 24.29 | 13,523 | 13.26 | 30,649 | 30.05 | 4,421 | 4.33 | 6,383 | 6.26 | 608 | 0.60 |
| Bohol | 108,979 | 29.19 | 36,566 | 9.79 | 61,588 | 16.50 | 121,111 | 32.44 | 14,001 | 3.75 | 21,909 | 5.87 | 9,215 | 2.47 |
| Bukidnon | 67,252 | 24.28 | 22,557 | 8.14 | 56,506 | 20.40 | 43,367 | 15.66 | 54,916 | 19.83 | 29,057 | 10.49 | 3,297 | 1.19 |
| Bulacan | 125,811 | 19.97 | 176,804 | 28.06 | 150,605 | 23.90 | 64,223 | 10.19 | 28,046 | 4.45 | 79,658 | 12.64 | 4,915 | 0.78 |
| Cagayan | 31,221 | 10.69 | 11,513 | 3.94 | 73,694 | 25.23 | 32,060 | 10.97 | 131,978 | 45.18 | 10,538 | 3.61 | 1,120 | 0.38 |
| Cagayan de Oro | 23,677 | 18.12 | 14,258 | 10.91 | 12,449 | 9.53 | 12,131 | 9.29 | 20,983 | 16.06 | 45,075 | 34.51 | 2,059 | 1.58 |
| Caloocan | 44,144 | 17.37 | 83,069 | 32.69 | 49,288 | 19.40 | 13,098 | 5.15 | 33,550 | 13.20 | 27,495 | 10.82 | 3,453 | 1.36 |
| Camarines Norte | 21,794 | 16.24 | 30,948 | 23.07 | 20,175 | 15.04 | 30,908 | 23.04 | 4,742 | 3.53 | 17,226 | 12.84 | 8,383 | 6.25 |
| Camarines Sur | 80,888 | 19.26 | 39,820 | 9.48 | 59,376 | 14.14 | 98,318 | 23.41 | 7,572 | 1.80 | 104,879 | 24.98 | 29,054 | 6.92 |
| Camiguin | 9,570 | 33.00 | 1,463 | 5.04 | 1,698 | 5.85 | 10,384 | 35.80 | 2,180 | 7.52 | 3,305 | 11.40 | 402 | 1.39 |
| Capiz | 29,533 | 13.01 | 154,178 | 67.90 | 25,851 | 11.38 | 8,592 | 3.78 | 2,702 | 1.19 | 5,107 | 2.25 | 1,111 | 0.49 |
| Catanduanes | 26,408 | 37.34 | 6,990 | 9.88 | 11,527 | 16.30 | 10,742 | 15.19 | 1,033 | 1.46 | 13,087 | 18.51 | 928 | 1.31 |
| Cavite | 113,525 | 23.70 | 107,914 | 22.53 | 83,576 | 17.45 | 80,608 | 16.83 | 47,340 | 9.88 | 38,090 | 7.95 | 7,945 | 1.66 |
| Cebu | 287,842 | 36.77 | 63,029 | 8.05 | 98,967 | 12.64 | 266,528 | 34.05 | 21,539 | 2.75 | 31,115 | 3.97 | 13,776 | 1.76 |
| Cebu City | 92,351 | 36.42 | 37,326 | 14.72 | 20,192 | 7.96 | 63,575 | 25.07 | 14,245 | 5.62 | 20,351 | 8.03 | 5,523 | 2.18 |
| Cotabato | 42,763 | 18.21 | 58,318 | 24.83 | 19,459 | 8.28 | 33,011 | 14.05 | 45,512 | 19.38 | 33,326 | 14.19 | 2,489 | 1.06 |
| Davao City | 88,105 | 27.84 | 39,105 | 12.36 | 38,939 | 12.30 | 49,950 | 15.78 | 45,508 | 14.38 | 51,502 | 16.27 | 3,348 | 1.06 |
| Davao del Norte | 93,010 | 25.67 | 28,771 | 7.94 | 27,677 | 7.64 | 72,642 | 20.05 | 71,754 | 19.80 | 63,903 | 17.63 | 4,610 | 1.27 |
| Davao del Sur | 56,104 | 26.72 | 13,040 | 6.21 | 60,766 | 28.94 | 27,415 | 13.06 | 24,216 | 11.53 | 25,840 | 12.31 | 2,563 | 1.22 |
| Davao Oriental | 25,431 | 21.02 | 5,682 | 4.70 | 24,858 | 20.55 | 43,332 | 35.82 | 7,270 | 6.01 | 12,885 | 10.65 | 1,500 | 1.24 |
| Eastern Samar | 36,375 | 32.32 | 9,539 | 8.48 | 7,988 | 7.10 | 18,736 | 16.65 | 22,601 | 20.08 | 16,086 | 14.29 | 1,214 | 1.08 |
| Ifugao | 11,136 | 24.37 | 3,372 | 7.38 | 4,643 | 10.16 | 12,971 | 28.39 | 3,642 | 7.97 | 9,568 | 20.94 | 357 | 0.78 |
| Ilocos Norte | 7,318 | 3.51 | 5,774 | 2.77 | 45,254 | 21.71 | 3,731 | 1.79 | 142,840 | 68.53 | 2,715 | 1.30 | 806 | 0.39 |
| Ilocos Sur | 16,540 | 7.54 | 13,374 | 6.10 | 71,407 | 32.57 | 27,194 | 12.40 | 84,655 | 38.61 | 4,589 | 2.09 | 1,505 | 0.69 |
| Iloilo | 39,944 | 7.14 | 457,588 | 81.76 | 24,000 | 4.29 | 29,357 | 5.25 | 1,452 | 0.26 | 6,464 | 1.16 | 835 | 0.15 |
| Iloilo City | 15,348 | 10.72 | 107,607 | 75.16 | 11,712 | 8.18 | 4,282 | 2.99 | 889 | 0.62 | 2,614 | 1.83 | 721 | 0.50 |
| Isabela | 49,097 | 13.17 | 21,958 | 5.89 | 163,174 | 43.77 | 25,078 | 6.73 | 79,024 | 21.20 | 31,226 | 8.38 | 3,219 | 0.86 |
| Kalinga-Apayao | 9,903 | 12.65 | 3,179 | 4.06 | 14,854 | 18.98 | 17,398 | 22.23 | 18,015 | 23.02 | 14,252 | 18.21 | 659 | 0.84 |
| La Union | 24,803 | 10.41 | 25,318 | 10.63 | 104,742 | 43.96 | 8,044 | 3.38 | 66,432 | 27.88 | 6,922 | 2.91 | 1,996 | 0.84 |
| Laguna | 101,757 | 18.14 | 140,046 | 24.97 | 123,100 | 21.95 | 54,086 | 9.64 | 41,683 | 7.43 | 75,440 | 13.45 | 24,812 | 4.42 |
| Lanao del Norte | 60,990 | 29.40 | 20,840 | 10.04 | 38,991 | 18.79 | 36,912 | 17.79 | 15,506 | 7.47 | 27,197 | 13.11 | 7,037 | 3.39 |
| Lanao del Sur | 46,564 | 34.61 | 8,523 | 6.33 | 21,729 | 16.15 | 29,556 | 21.97 | 2,373 | 1.76 | 15,561 | 11.57 | 10,235 | 7.61 |
| Las Piñas–Muntinlupa | 44,673 | 21.91 | 63,112 | 30.95 | 36,996 | 18.14 | 13,808 | 6.77 | 16,788 | 8.23 | 24,510 | 12.02 | 4,052 | 1.99 |
| Leyte | 120,607 | 22.02 | 21,708 | 3.96 | 36,562 | 6.68 | 90,090 | 16.45 | 233,270 | 42.60 | 42,429 | 7.75 | 2,957 | 0.54 |
| Maguindanao | 39,317 | 16.30 | 23,352 | 9.68 | 57,555 | 23.86 | 90,466 | 37.50 | 10,220 | 4.24 | 14,118 | 5.85 | 6,188 | 2.57 |
| Makati | 50,156 | 21.71 | 69,896 | 30.26 | 42,267 | 18.30 | 10,249 | 4.44 | 31,317 | 13.56 | 22,300 | 9.65 | 4,821 | 2.09 |
| Malabon–Navotas | 28,742 | 16.73 | 53,948 | 31.40 | 34,065 | 19.83 | 14,924 | 8.69 | 18,805 | 10.95 | 19,399 | 11.29 | 1,927 | 1.12 |
| Manila | 148,927 | 20.71 | 210,214 | 29.24 | 115,329 | 16.04 | 39,892 | 5.55 | 106,982 | 14.88 | 86,108 | 11.98 | 11,562 | 1.61 |
| Marikina | 26,214 | 20.57 | 37,436 | 29.37 | 17,534 | 13.76 | 8,518 | 6.68 | 8,031 | 6.30 | 27,909 | 21.90 | 1,801 | 1.41 |
| Marinduque | 19,230 | 25.47 | 15,098 | 20.00 | 14,286 | 18.92 | 18,336 | 24.29 | 2,341 | 3.10 | 4,581 | 6.07 | 1,626 | 2.15 |
| Masbate | 55,125 | 29.23 | 20,396 | 10.81 | 45,464 | 24.11 | 50,840 | 26.96 | 1,996 | 1.06 | 13,675 | 7.25 | 1,111 | 0.59 |
| Misamis Occidental | 76,177 | 44.13 | 10,515 | 6.09 | 30,944 | 17.92 | 25,004 | 14.48 | 7,643 | 4.43 | 19,131 | 11.08 | 3,225 | 1.87 |
| Misamis Oriental | 40,832 | 19.67 | 11,361 | 5.47 | 7,769 | 3.74 | 46,848 | 22.57 | 32,127 | 15.47 | 63,580 | 30.62 | 5,092 | 2.45 |
| Mountain Province | 16,394 | 39.35 | 7,388 | 17.73 | 4,382 | 10.52 | 5,711 | 13.71 | 1,516 | 3.64 | 5,772 | 13.85 | 501 | 1.20 |
| Negros Occidental | 160,518 | 24.22 | 276,217 | 41.67 | 147,079 | 22.19 | 48,755 | 7.35 | 4,785 | 0.72 | 22,519 | 3.40 | 3,013 | 0.45 |
| Negros Oriental | 124,998 | 40.06 | 30,069 | 9.64 | 54,789 | 17.56 | 79,924 | 25.61 | 3,824 | 1.23 | 14,221 | 4.56 | 4,211 | 1.35 |
| Northern Samar | 32,611 | 23.48 | 5,353 | 3.85 | 6,330 | 4.56 | 20,515 | 14.77 | 22,982 | 16.55 | 50,368 | 36.27 | 723 | 0.52 |
| Nueva Ecija | 76,789 | 14.43 | 82,634 | 15.53 | 227,512 | 42.76 | 59,241 | 11.13 | 50,879 | 9.56 | 31,847 | 5.99 | 3,195 | 0.60 |
| Nueva Vizcaya | 17,677 | 15.61 | 8,784 | 7.76 | 33,838 | 29.89 | 20,697 | 18.28 | 22,841 | 20.18 | 8,586 | 7.58 | 788 | 0.70 |
| Occidental Mindoro | 13,151 | 13.83 | 19,375 | 20.37 | 23,893 | 25.12 | 19,897 | 20.92 | 9,497 | 9.98 | 5,770 | 6.07 | 3,539 | 3.72 |
| Oriental Mindoro | 30,164 | 16.30 | 26,012 | 14.06 | 29,310 | 15.84 | 34,305 | 18.54 | 8,365 | 4.52 | 38,056 | 20.56 | 18,845 | 10.18 |
| Palawan | 8,058 | 4.38 | 7,669 | 4.17 | 17,802 | 9.68 | 136,492 | 74.21 | 10,603 | 5.76 | 2,595 | 1.41 | 718 | 0.39 |
| Pampanga | 286,866 | 50.21 | 114,040 | 19.96 | 91,505 | 16.02 | 39,843 | 6.97 | 6,020 | 1.05 | 30,936 | 5.42 | 2,090 | 0.37 |
| Pangasinan | 477,992 | 62.58 | 29,618 | 3.88 | 155,062 | 20.30 | 28,040 | 3.67 | 61,623 | 8.07 | 8,734 | 1.14 | 2,699 | 0.35 |
| Parañaque | 30,468 | 23.37 | 40,879 | 31.35 | 20,148 | 15.45 | 7,942 | 6.09 | 10,629 | 8.15 | 17,603 | 13.50 | 2,721 | 2.09 |
| Pasay | 27,051 | 18.53 | 45,423 | 31.11 | 23,565 | 16.14 | 8,193 | 5.61 | 24,986 | 17.12 | 13,747 | 9.42 | 3,021 | 2.07 |
| Pasig | 30,057 | 19.86 | 44,447 | 29.37 | 24,473 | 16.17 | 5,966 | 3.94 | 10,419 | 6.89 | 33,850 | 22.37 | 2,100 | 1.39 |
| Quezon | 95,638 | 20.25 | 91,235 | 19.32 | 82,423 | 17.45 | 75,281 | 15.94 | 11,950 | 2.53 | 82,981 | 17.57 | 32,709 | 6.93 |
| Quezon City | 167,052 | 21.80 | 214,983 | 28.06 | 136,324 | 17.79 | 40,696 | 5.31 | 82,629 | 10.78 | 111,599 | 14.57 | 12,877 | 1.68 |
| Quirino | 10,610 | 20.75 | 3,072 | 6.01 | 11,116 | 21.74 | 13,488 | 26.38 | 7,199 | 14.08 | 4,739 | 9.27 | 909 | 1.78 |
| Rizal | 62,306 | 16.41 | 101,324 | 26.68 | 85,150 | 22.42 | 31,149 | 8.20 | 26,385 | 6.95 | 68,420 | 18.02 | 5,035 | 1.33 |
| Romblon | 26,105 | 33.12 | 13,875 | 17.60 | 7,125 | 9.04 | 26,435 | 33.54 | 1,103 | 1.40 | 3,609 | 4.58 | 568 | 0.72 |
| Samar | 29,279 | 16.12 | 6,382 | 3.51 | 8,235 | 4.53 | 22,114 | 12.17 | 56,775 | 31.25 | 58,052 | 31.95 | 839 | 0.46 |
| San Juan–Mandaluyong | 38,469 | 22.83 | 49,308 | 29.27 | 30,041 | 17.83 | 14,365 | 8.53 | 15,131 | 8.98 | 18,184 | 10.79 | 2,978 | 1.77 |
| Siquijor | 4,350 | 13.20 | 1,250 | 3.79 | 9,196 | 27.91 | 14,107 | 42.82 | 454 | 1.38 | 472 | 1.43 | 3,116 | 9.46 |
| Sorsogon | 46,829 | 24.82 | 24,785 | 13.14 | 28,205 | 14.95 | 34,674 | 18.38 | 2,730 | 1.45 | 45,560 | 24.15 | 5,893 | 3.12 |
| South Cotabato | 54,171 | 15.69 | 94,425 | 27.36 | 35,682 | 10.34 | 43,595 | 12.63 | 69,028 | 20.00 | 44,853 | 12.99 | 3,428 | 0.99 |
| Southern Leyte | 35,386 | 27.37 | 6,039 | 4.67 | 28,170 | 21.79 | 40,635 | 31.43 | 10,493 | 8.12 | 6,543 | 5.06 | 2,002 | 1.55 |
| Sultan Kudarat | 15,582 | 12.35 | 45,348 | 35.93 | 15,684 | 12.43 | 21,265 | 16.85 | 23,529 | 18.64 | 4,112 | 3.26 | 679 | 0.54 |
| Sulu | 54,530 | 33.88 | 3,818 | 2.37 | 17,635 | 10.96 | 73,555 | 45.70 | 2,639 | 1.64 | 4,256 | 2.64 | 4,502 | 2.80 |
| Surigao del Norte | 59,559 | 36.99 | 6,539 | 4.06 | 22,898 | 14.22 | 41,327 | 25.67 | 7,967 | 4.95 | 20,197 | 12.55 | 2,507 | 1.56 |
| Surigao del Sur | 46,238 | 26.69 | 11,260 | 6.50 | 20,097 | 11.60 | 36,044 | 20.81 | 13,330 | 7.70 | 34,186 | 19.74 | 12,063 | 6.96 |
| Taguig–Pateros | 20,258 | 17.73 | 36,109 | 31.60 | 18,375 | 16.08 | 9,119 | 7.98 | 11,849 | 10.37 | 16,876 | 14.77 | 1,667 | 1.46 |
| Tarlac | 99,319 | 29.19 | 32,157 | 9.45 | 174,084 | 51.17 | 24,520 | 7.21 | 1,325 | 0.39 | 8,054 | 2.37 | 756 | 0.22 |
| Tawi-Tawi | 11,707 | 18.22 | 2,504 | 3.90 | 12,551 | 19.54 | 30,438 | 47.38 | 2,522 | 3.93 | 4,074 | 6.34 | 447 | 0.70 |
| Valenzuela | 22,960 | 18.60 | 41,464 | 33.59 | 23,896 | 19.36 | 6,628 | 5.37 | 8,730 | 7.07 | 18,468 | 14.96 | 1,293 | 1.05 |
| Zambales | 67,306 | 27.39 | 70,002 | 28.49 | 51,932 | 21.13 | 10,766 | 4.38 | 36,288 | 14.77 | 7,824 | 3.18 | 1,617 | 0.66 |
| Zamboanga City | 21,219 | 16.31 | 44,539 | 34.23 | 15,328 | 11.78 | 24,157 | 18.56 | 8,047 | 6.18 | 13,796 | 10.60 | 3,044 | 2.34 |
| Zamboanga del Norte | 90,009 | 38.07 | 28,400 | 12.01 | 41,564 | 17.58 | 55,774 | 23.59 | 6,102 | 2.58 | 12,475 | 5.28 | 2,118 | 0.90 |
| Zamboanga del Sur | 105,123 | 31.01 | 33,096 | 9.76 | 83,172 | 24.53 | 63,410 | 18.70 | 14,794 | 4.36 | 32,269 | 9.52 | 7,174 | 2.12 |
| Absentee voters | 1,819 | 23.19 | 1,141 | 14.55 | 3,201 | 40.81 | 172 | 2.19 | 1,051 | 13.40 | 155 | 1.98 | 304 | 3.88 |
| Total | 5,342,521 | 23.58 | 4,468,173 | 19.72 | 4,116,376 | 18.17 | 3,316,661 | 14.64 | 2,338,294 | 10.32 | 2,302,124 | 10.16 | 770,046 | 3.40 |
Source: Commission on Elections

== Vice presidential election ==
| Candidate | Party | Votes | % |
|---|---|---|---|
| Joseph Estrada | Nationalist People's Coalition | 6,739,738 | 33.01 |
| Marcelo Fernan | Laban ng Demokratikong Pilipino | 4,438,494 | 21.74 |
| Lito Osmeña | Lakas–NUCD | 3,362,467 | 16.47 |
| Ramon Magsaysay Jr. | People's Reform Party | 2,900,556 | 14.20 |
| Nene Pimentel (Note: Running mate of Jovito Salonga (Liberal Party)) | PDP–Laban | 2,023,289 | 9.91 |
| Vicente Magsaysay | Kilusang Bagong Lipunan | 699,895 | 3.43 |
| Eva Estrada Kalaw | Nacionalista Party | 255,730 | 1.25 |
| Total | | 20,420,169 | 100.00 |
| Valid votes | | 20,420,169 | 84.19 |
| Invalid/blank votes | | 3,834,785 | 15.81 |
| Total votes | | 24,254,954 | 100.00 |
| Registered voters/turnout | | 32,141,079 | 75.46 |
Source: Nohlen, Grotz, Hartmann, Hasall and Santos

| Region | Estrada | | Fernan | | Osmeña | | R. Magsaysay | | Pimentel | | V. Magsaysay | | Kalaw | |
| Region | Votes | % | Votes | % | Votes | % | Votes | % | Votes | % | Votes | % | Votes | % |
|---|---|---|---|---|---|---|---|---|---|---|---|---|---|---|
| Abra | 42,100 | 62.73 | 5,245 | 7.82 | 3,576 | 5.33 | 3,756 | 5.60 | 4,892 | 7.29 | 7,325 | 10.92 | 215 | 0.32 |
| Agusan del Norte | 22,395 | 13.77 | 47,052 | 28.92 | 51,975 | 31.95 | 8,837 | 5.43 | 19,579 | 12.03 | 12,431 | 7.64 | 417 | 0.26 |
| Agusan del Sur | 24,561 | 23.03 | 29,692 | 27.85 | 8,450 | 7.92 | 10,463 | 9.81 | 23,252 | 21.81 | 9,549 | 8.96 | 666 | 0.62 |
| Aklan | 43,738 | 33.60 | 34,057 | 26.17 | 13,342 | 10.25 | 29,985 | 23.04 | 7,561 | 5.81 | 1,085 | 0.83 | 394 | 0.30 |
| Albay | 104,611 | 37.44 | 60,441 | 21.63 | 24,874 | 8.90 | 35,373 | 12.66 | 48,548 | 17.37 | 2,049 | 0.73 | 3,536 | 1.27 |
| Antique | 21,731 | 17.52 | 23,025 | 18.57 | 20,441 | 16.48 | 50,038 | 40.35 | 5,262 | 4.24 | 2,394 | 1.93 | 1,119 | 0.90 |
| Aurora | 23,737 | 50.55 | 9,665 | 20.58 | 3,531 | 7.52 | 2,983 | 6.35 | 5,113 | 10.89 | 1,470 | 3.13 | 463 | 0.99 |
| Bacolod | 17,659 | 15.30 | 17,696 | 15.33 | 26,294 | 22.79 | 44,608 | 38.66 | 6,861 | 5.95 | 1,555 | 1.35 | 727 | 0.63 |
| Baguio | 19,731 | 27.62 | 12,556 | 17.58 | 5,945 | 8.32 | 22,316 | 31.24 | 7,075 | 9.90 | 3,242 | 4.54 | 574 | 0.80 |
| Basilan | 15,205 | 40.15 | 7,803 | 20.60 | 5,887 | 15.55 | 3,489 | 9.21 | 4,739 | 12.51 | 494 | 1.30 | 253 | 0.67 |
| Bataan | 65,587 | 38.00 | 31,912 | 18.49 | 14,062 | 8.15 | 39,074 | 22.64 | 16,020 | 9.28 | 5,361 | 3.11 | 561 | 0.33 |
| Batanes | 1,278 | 26.01 | 1,437 | 29.24 | 326 | 6.63 | 353 | 7.18 | 1,432 | 29.14 | 51 | 1.04 | 37 | 0.75 |
| Batangas | 181,306 | 34.98 | 98,572 | 19.02 | 44,543 | 8.59 | 46,334 | 8.94 | 25,327 | 4.89 | 3,585 | 0.69 | 118,699 | 22.90 |
| Benguet | 16,741 | 18.70 | 29,499 | 32.95 | 9,356 | 10.45 | 26,064 | 29.12 | 4,870 | 5.44 | 2,644 | 2.95 | 341 | 0.38 |
| Bohol | 53,350 | 16.17 | 182,440 | 55.29 | 63,753 | 19.32 | 9,082 | 2.75 | 16,481 | 4.99 | 2,868 | 0.87 | 1,988 | 0.60 |
| Bukidnon | 58,656 | 24.78 | 51,500 | 21.76 | 51,670 | 21.83 | 17,689 | 7.47 | 38,564 | 16.29 | 17,615 | 7.44 | 985 | 0.42 |
| Bulacan | 294,331 | 49.85 | 89,554 | 15.17 | 56,051 | 9.49 | 74,442 | 12.61 | 64,674 | 10.95 | 8,982 | 1.52 | 2,405 | 0.41 |
| Cagayan | 125,665 | 50.88 | 49,882 | 20.20 | 20,962 | 8.49 | 16,905 | 6.85 | 8,369 | 3.39 | 24,676 | 9.99 | 506 | 0.20 |
| Cagayan de Oro | 18,183 | 14.56 | 25,134 | 20.12 | 13,510 | 10.82 | 8,966 | 7.18 | 53,733 | 43.02 | 4,936 | 3.95 | 442 | 0.35 |
| Caloocan | 103,354 | 41.23 | 29,576 | 11.80 | 27,127 | 10.82 | 51,182 | 20.42 | 25,237 | 10.07 | 12,573 | 5.02 | 1,651 | 0.66 |
| Camarines Norte | 45,810 | 37.77 | 29,871 | 24.63 | 8,152 | 6.72 | 26,225 | 21.62 | 7,580 | 6.25 | 1,431 | 1.18 | 2,218 | 1.83 |
| Camarines Sur | 147,240 | 40.28 | 90,868 | 24.86 | 36,280 | 9.92 | 30,070 | 8.23 | 53,630 | 14.67 | 2,426 | 0.66 | 5,028 | 1.38 |
| Camiguin | 2,341 | 9.53 | 9,468 | 38.54 | 4,973 | 20.24 | 605 | 2.46 | 6,650 | 27.07 | 453 | 1.84 | 77 | 0.31 |
| Capiz | 43,883 | 25.53 | 34,925 | 20.32 | 12,687 | 7.38 | 69,834 | 40.63 | 8,691 | 5.06 | 1,489 | 0.87 | 380 | 0.22 |
| Catanduanes | 26,466 | 42.43 | 9,845 | 15.78 | 12,807 | 20.53 | 2,292 | 3.67 | 10,414 | 16.70 | 326 | 0.52 | 223 | 0.36 |
| Cavite | 171,321 | 37.98 | 98,595 | 21.86 | 70,756 | 15.69 | 60,585 | 13.43 | 30,571 | 6.78 | 16,860 | 3.74 | 2,413 | 0.53 |
| Cebu | 74,178 | 10.03 | 372,571 | 50.35 | 259,273 | 35.04 | 12,936 | 1.75 | 12,089 | 1.63 | 6,130 | 0.83 | 2,746 | 0.37 |
| Cebu City | 15,104 | 5.99 | 132,556 | 52.58 | 81,795 | 32.44 | 9,044 | 3.59 | 8,537 | 3.39 | 3,962 | 1.57 | 1,111 | 0.44 |
| Cotabato | 48,326 | 23.49 | 32,055 | 15.58 | 29,628 | 14.40 | 48,130 | 23.40 | 29,315 | 14.25 | 17,421 | 8.47 | 839 | 0.41 |
| Davao City | 62,075 | 21.04 | 84,742 | 28.72 | 66,977 | 22.70 | 28,033 | 9.50 | 42,387 | 14.37 | 9,900 | 3.36 | 904 | 0.31 |
| Davao del Norte | 54,628 | 17.34 | 86,179 | 27.35 | 60,232 | 19.12 | 35,337 | 11.22 | 57,637 | 18.29 | 19,592 | 6.22 | 1,458 | 0.46 |
| Davao del Sur | 62,893 | 33.88 | 34,073 | 18.36 | 51,203 | 27.58 | 9,235 | 4.98 | 20,665 | 11.13 | 7,063 | 3.81 | 487 | 0.26 |
| Davao Oriental | 33,650 | 31.76 | 34,097 | 32.18 | 15,538 | 14.67 | 4,720 | 4.46 | 16,121 | 15.22 | 1,455 | 1.37 | 364 | 0.34 |
| Eastern Samar | 21,432 | 23.48 | 26,236 | 28.74 | 27,834 | 30.49 | 3,992 | 4.37 | 8,960 | 9.81 | 2,209 | 2.42 | 627 | 0.69 |
| Ifugao | 11,292 | 28.64 | 11,264 | 28.57 | 6,412 | 16.26 | 3,981 | 10.10 | 5,644 | 14.32 | 655 | 1.66 | 177 | 0.45 |
| Ilocos Norte | 84,658 | 46.49 | 7,399 | 4.06 | 5,630 | 3.09 | 10,935 | 6.01 | 11,799 | 6.48 | 61,264 | 33.64 | 406 | 0.22 |
| Ilocos Sur | 104,677 | 54.01 | 36,328 | 18.74 | 11,057 | 5.71 | 16,948 | 8.74 | 9,833 | 5.07 | 14,364 | 7.41 | 603 | 0.31 |
| Iloilo | 29,434 | 6.54 | 58,721 | 13.05 | 26,358 | 5.86 | 325,395 | 72.30 | 7,021 | 1.56 | 2,503 | 0.56 | 660 | 0.15 |
| Iloilo City | 8,650 | 6.72 | 21,895 | 17.00 | 12,692 | 9.85 | 80,889 | 62.80 | 3,251 | 2.52 | 1,060 | 0.82 | 359 | 0.28 |
| Isabela | 244,931 | 71.98 | 29,074 | 8.54 | 19,370 | 5.69 | 16,806 | 4.94 | 19,701 | 5.79 | 9,286 | 2.73 | 1,096 | 0.32 |
| Kalinga-Apayao | 26,964 | 41.55 | 16,497 | 25.42 | 4,638 | 7.15 | 3,858 | 5.94 | 9,658 | 14.88 | 2,640 | 4.07 | 640 | 0.99 |
| La Union | 135,256 | 62.04 | 15,028 | 6.89 | 14,859 | 6.82 | 26,729 | 12.26 | 10,076 | 4.62 | 15,179 | 6.96 | 882 | 0.40 |
| Laguna | 280,230 | 52.63 | 68,592 | 12.88 | 44,977 | 8.45 | 63,869 | 11.99 | 57,987 | 10.89 | 11,841 | 2.22 | 4,968 | 0.93 |
| Lanao del Norte | 45,712 | 25.13 | 55,282 | 30.39 | 41,010 | 22.54 | 8,632 | 4.75 | 26,457 | 14.54 | 2,880 | 1.58 | 1,930 | 1.06 |
| Lanao del Sur | 26,245 | 24.70 | 9,647 | 9.08 | 15,008 | 14.12 | 4,778 | 4.50 | 48,385 | 45.54 | 1,205 | 1.13 | 988 | 0.93 |
| Las Piñas–Muntinlupa | 70,322 | 35.36 | 27,731 | 13.94 | 32,849 | 16.52 | 34,907 | 17.55 | 24,437 | 12.29 | 6,798 | 3.42 | 1,831 | 0.92 |
| Leyte | 75,102 | 16.77 | 138,206 | 30.85 | 127,175 | 28.39 | 13,066 | 2.92 | 22,591 | 5.04 | 70,742 | 15.79 | 1,056 | 0.24 |
| Maguindanao | 101,300 | 47.93 | 56,544 | 26.76 | 19,871 | 9.40 | 14,013 | 6.63 | 11,973 | 5.67 | 4,409 | 2.09 | 3,220 | 1.52 |
| Makati | 74,528 | 32.43 | 29,643 | 12.90 | 32,263 | 14.04 | 44,421 | 19.33 | 34,333 | 14.94 | 12,742 | 5.54 | 1,887 | 0.82 |
| Malabon–Navotas | 74,150 | 44.45 | 22,865 | 13.71 | 17,469 | 10.47 | 28,135 | 16.87 | 16,903 | 10.13 | 6,210 | 3.72 | 1,067 | 0.64 |
| Manila | 240,462 | 34.06 | 103,220 | 14.62 | 101,610 | 14.39 | 127,854 | 18.11 | 87,204 | 12.35 | 39,544 | 5.60 | 6,089 | 0.86 |
| Marikina | 39,285 | 32.66 | 14,462 | 12.02 | 16,534 | 13.75 | 21,991 | 18.28 | 23,718 | 19.72 | 3,453 | 2.87 | 827 | 0.69 |
| Marinduque | 30,488 | 45.72 | 17,381 | 26.06 | 8,595 | 12.89 | 5,226 | 7.84 | 4,094 | 6.14 | 500 | 0.75 | 401 | 0.60 |
| Masbate | 55,325 | 35.96 | 43,308 | 28.15 | 32,705 | 21.26 | 13,310 | 8.65 | 7,929 | 5.15 | 967 | 0.63 | 307 | 0.20 |
| Misamis Occidental | 31,970 | 20.93 | 54,406 | 35.61 | 39,843 | 26.08 | 4,061 | 2.66 | 20,387 | 13.34 | 1,529 | 1.00 | 577 | 0.38 |
| Misamis Oriental | 13,164 | 7.22 | 55,706 | 30.54 | 20,621 | 11.30 | 9,903 | 5.43 | 76,118 | 41.73 | 5,404 | 2.96 | 1,511 | 0.83 |
| Mountain Province | 7,293 | 22.18 | 7,771 | 23.63 | 8,126 | 24.71 | 5,048 | 15.35 | 3,851 | 11.71 | 558 | 1.70 | 233 | 0.71 |
| Negros Occidental | 140,203 | 24.85 | 57,674 | 10.22 | 126,591 | 22.44 | 214,112 | 37.95 | 19,577 | 3.47 | 4,722 | 0.84 | 1,307 | 0.23 |
| Negros Oriental | 51,260 | 18.88 | 100,778 | 37.13 | 90,556 | 33.36 | 13,668 | 5.04 | 11,482 | 4.23 | 1,628 | 0.60 | 2,078 | 0.77 |
| Northern Samar | 23,041 | 20.38 | 22,128 | 19.57 | 19,905 | 17.61 | 4,603 | 4.07 | 40,224 | 35.58 | 2,826 | 2.50 | 332 | 0.29 |
| Nueva Ecija | 324,796 | 64.83 | 64,383 | 12.85 | 31,861 | 6.36 | 43,633 | 8.71 | 23,729 | 4.74 | 11,279 | 2.25 | 1,346 | 0.27 |
| Nueva Vizcaya | 52,488 | 50.06 | 23,676 | 22.58 | 6,742 | 6.43 | 12,011 | 11.46 | 5,153 | 4.91 | 4,427 | 4.22 | 349 | 0.33 |
| Occidental Mindoro | 41,737 | 48.53 | 17,762 | 20.65 | 5,873 | 6.83 | 11,041 | 12.84 | 5,407 | 6.29 | 3,352 | 3.90 | 838 | 0.97 |
| Oriental Mindoro | 74,346 | 45.61 | 35,250 | 21.62 | 12,735 | 7.81 | 10,816 | 6.63 | 24,999 | 15.34 | 1,990 | 1.22 | 2,879 | 1.77 |
| Palawan | 37,605 | 23.09 | 105,094 | 64.54 | 5,928 | 3.64 | 5,670 | 3.48 | 4,937 | 3.03 | 3,130 | 1.92 | 468 | 0.29 |
| Pampanga | 108,338 | 20.86 | 95,499 | 18.39 | 177,408 | 34.16 | 84,316 | 16.24 | 43,865 | 8.45 | 7,292 | 1.40 | 2,572 | 0.50 |
| Pangasinan | 310,428 | 42.64 | 66,404 | 9.12 | 247,328 | 33.98 | 56,953 | 7.82 | 15,701 | 2.16 | 19,129 | 2.63 | 12,023 | 1.65 |
| Parañaque | 39,650 | 30.84 | 19,156 | 14.90 | 21,240 | 16.52 | 22,696 | 17.65 | 20,647 | 16.06 | 3,954 | 3.08 | 1,222 | 0.95 |
| Pasay | 54,003 | 38.12 | 20,143 | 14.22 | 17,558 | 12.39 | 26,172 | 18.47 | 15,166 | 10.70 | 7,242 | 5.11 | 1,393 | 0.98 |
| Pasig | 56,479 | 37.84 | 16,400 | 10.99 | 17,516 | 11.74 | 24,274 | 16.27 | 29,366 | 19.68 | 4,322 | 2.90 | 881 | 0.59 |
| Quezon | 202,266 | 46.84 | 82,188 | 19.03 | 35,645 | 8.25 | 58,730 | 13.60 | 43,549 | 10.08 | 4,711 | 1.09 | 4,750 | 1.10 |
| Quezon City | 254,200 | 33.69 | 112,617 | 14.93 | 119,707 | 15.86 | 120,256 | 15.94 | 107,365 | 14.23 | 32,525 | 4.31 | 7,873 | 1.04 |
| Quirino | 19,265 | 42.23 | 13,113 | 28.74 | 3,874 | 8.49 | 4,001 | 8.77 | 2,720 | 5.96 | 2,465 | 5.40 | 183 | 0.40 |
| Rizal | 176,053 | 48.77 | 43,813 | 12.14 | 37,090 | 10.27 | 47,406 | 13.13 | 46,497 | 12.88 | 7,823 | 2.17 | 2,314 | 0.64 |
| Romblon | 13,383 | 19.56 | 28,454 | 41.59 | 18,007 | 26.32 | 5,391 | 7.88 | 2,441 | 3.57 | 587 | 0.86 | 160 | 0.23 |
| Samar | 35,327 | 25.53 | 30,049 | 21.72 | 20,445 | 14.78 | 5,101 | 3.69 | 39,453 | 28.51 | 7,548 | 5.45 | 447 | 0.32 |
| San Juan–Mandaluyong | 63,530 | 38.44 | 26,374 | 15.96 | 26,185 | 15.85 | 25,258 | 15.28 | 17,799 | 10.77 | 4,820 | 2.92 | 1,289 | 0.78 |
| Siquijor | 8,354 | 28.39 | 15,191 | 51.63 | 3,395 | 11.54 | 389 | 1.32 | 262 | 0.89 | 165 | 0.56 | 1,667 | 5.67 |
| Sorsogon | 67,315 | 41.49 | 35,309 | 21.76 | 20,943 | 12.91 | 13,591 | 8.38 | 22,207 | 13.69 | 1,118 | 0.69 | 1,777 | 1.10 |
| South Cotabato | 89,757 | 28.61 | 49,808 | 15.88 | 30,410 | 9.69 | 66,945 | 21.34 | 56,185 | 17.91 | 18,891 | 6.02 | 1,716 | 0.55 |
| Southern Leyte | 23,848 | 20.73 | 57,804 | 50.24 | 23,248 | 20.21 | 2,600 | 2.26 | 4,164 | 3.62 | 2,973 | 2.58 | 411 | 0.36 |
| Sultan Kudarat | 40,658 | 37.48 | 15,534 | 14.32 | 7,961 | 7.34 | 31,262 | 28.82 | 6,190 | 5.71 | 6,580 | 6.07 | 294 | 0.27 |
| Sulu | 34,196 | 22.95 | 62,483 | 41.93 | 45,512 | 30.54 | 1,017 | 0.68 | 2,854 | 1.92 | 661 | 0.44 | 2,289 | 1.54 |
| Surigao del Norte | 27,862 | 19.47 | 44,906 | 31.38 | 39,788 | 27.80 | 5,116 | 3.57 | 22,158 | 15.48 | 2,112 | 1.48 | 1,169 | 0.82 |
| Surigao del Sur | 26,090 | 18.26 | 43,036 | 30.13 | 21,678 | 15.18 | 7,090 | 4.96 | 35,185 | 24.63 | 3,189 | 2.23 | 6,583 | 4.61 |
| Taguig–Pateros | 44,026 | 39.78 | 16,493 | 14.90 | 11,101 | 10.03 | 20,224 | 18.27 | 14,215 | 12.84 | 3,939 | 3.56 | 681 | 0.62 |
| Tarlac | 148,649 | 48.17 | 51,899 | 16.82 | 53,805 | 17.44 | 34,836 | 11.29 | 15,512 | 5.03 | 2,446 | 0.79 | 1,438 | 0.47 |
| Tawi-Tawi | 26,350 | 46.76 | 19,603 | 34.79 | 5,159 | 9.16 | 637 | 1.13 | 3,168 | 5.62 | 984 | 1.75 | 450 | 0.80 |
| Valenzuela | 50,119 | 41.75 | 14,608 | 12.17 | 13,787 | 11.49 | 21,248 | 17.70 | 15,936 | 13.28 | 3,682 | 3.07 | 656 | 0.55 |
| Zambales | 21,467 | 9.48 | 23,046 | 10.18 | 21,602 | 9.54 | 135,447 | 59.84 | 6,315 | 2.79 | 17,923 | 7.92 | 534 | 0.24 |
| Zamboanga City | 27,519 | 22.49 | 49,815 | 40.71 | 13,173 | 10.77 | 18,127 | 14.81 | 11,200 | 9.15 | 2,105 | 1.72 | 422 | 0.34 |
| Zamboanga del Norte | 45,237 | 22.13 | 69,848 | 34.17 | 65,400 | 31.99 | 6,819 | 3.34 | 14,713 | 7.20 | 1,756 | 0.86 | 638 | 0.31 |
| Zamboanga del Sur | 101,285 | 33.72 | 73,140 | 24.35 | 78,989 | 26.30 | 10,812 | 3.60 | 28,527 | 9.50 | 4,002 | 1.33 | 3,628 | 1.21 |
| Absentee voters | 3,904 | 51.52 | 1,227 | 16.19 | 840 | 11.08 | 1,006 | 13.28 | 235 | 3.10 | 262 | 3.46 | 104 | 1.37 |
| Total | 6,739,738 | 33.01 | 4,438,494 | 21.74 | 3,362,467 | 16.47 | 2,900,556 | 14.20 | 2,023,289 | 9.91 | 699,895 | 3.43 | 255,730 | 1.25 |
Source: Commission on Elections
