= Congressional canvass for the 1998 Philippine presidential election =

The following is the official canvassing of votes by the Congress of the Philippines for the 1998 Philippine presidential and vice presidential election. The canvassing started on May 26, 1998, and finished on May 27, 1998.

== Presidential election ==
Candidate	Party	Votes	%
Joseph Estrada	Laban ng Makabayang Masang Pilipino	10,722,295	39.86
Jose de Venecia Jr.	Lakas–NUCD–UMDP	4,268,483	15.87
Raul Roco	Aksyon Demokratiko	3,720,212	13.83
Lito Osmeña	PROMDI	3,347,631	12.44
Alfredo Lim	Liberal Party	2,344,362	8.71
Renato de Villa	Partido para sa Demokratikong Reporma–Lapiang Manggagawa	1,308,352	4.86
Miriam Defensor Santiago	People's Reform Party	797,206	2.96
Juan Ponce Enrile	Independent	343,139	1.28
Santiago Dumlao	Kilusan para sa Pambansang Pagpapanibago	32,212	0.12
Manuel Morato	Partido Bansang Marangal	18,644	0.07
Total		26,902,536	100.00
Valid votes		26,902,536	91.86
Invalid/blank votes (Note: Includes 232,714 votes for Imelda Marcos (Kilusang Bagong Lipunan) who withdrew after the ballots were printed.)		2,383,239	8.14
Total votes		29,285,775	100.00
Registered voters/turnout		33,873,665	86.46
Source: Nohlen, Grotz, Hartmann, Hasall and Santos

Province/City	Estrada		De Venecia		Roco		Osmeña		Lim		De Villa		Santiago		Enrile		Dumlao		Morato	
Province/City	Votes	%	Votes	%	Votes	%	Votes	%	Votes	%	Votes	%	Votes	%	Votes	%	Votes	%	Votes	%
Abra	49,352	63.68	20,190	26.05	2,449	3.16	212	0.27	3,182	4.11	1,266	1.63	354	0.46	315	0.41	156	0.20	24	0.03
Agusan del Norte	93,421	46.00	35,170	17.32	4,609	2.27	53,414	26.30	10,998	5.41	3,092	1.52	879	0.43	1,228	0.60	264	0.13	34	0.02
Agusan del Sur	75,783	45.98	29,135	17.68	2,743	1.66	47,983	29.12	4,874	2.96	1,516	0.92	1,630	0.99	972	0.59	47	0.03	118	0.07
Aklan	98,290	57.23	24,061	14.01	8,576	4.99	3,618	2.11	23,082	13.44	1,776	1.03	12,052	7.02	113	0.07	97	0.06	71	0.04
Albay	31,469	7.92	20,457	5.15	338,063	85.06	435	0.11	4,516	1.14	1,746	0.44	370	0.09	216	0.05	102	0.03	47	0.01
Antique	59,766	36.94	30,171	18.65	12,185	7.53	3,029	1.87	17,625	10.89	1,741	1.08	36,817	22.75	334	0.21	50	0.03	86	0.05
Apayao	14,588	53.27	6,854	25.03	991	3.62	193	0.70	411	1.50	328	1.20	107	0.39	3,885	14.19	8	0.03	18	0.07
Aurora	45,320	72.11	10,932	17.39	3,180	5.06	140	0.22	1,947	3.10	632	1.01	491	0.78	155	0.25	23	0.04	31	0.05
Bacolod	72,602	41.83	12,556	7.23	7,916	4.56	31,789	18.31	30,471	17.55	7,139	4.11	10,581	6.10	362	0.21	118	0.07	48	0.03
Baguio	29,191	31.90	19,570	21.38	21,439	23.42	1,037	1.13	12,859	14.05	4,180	4.57	2,001	2.19	1,021	1.12	160	0.17	64	0.07
Basilan	63,126	57.14	26,746	24.21	1,173	1.06	8,691	7.87	6,204	5.62	3,228	2.92	666	0.60	484	0.44	24	0.02	127	0.11
Bataan	137,546	56.54	32,664	13.43	33,864	13.92	1,673	0.69	28,488	11.71	5,979	2.46	2,435	1.00	390	0.16	135	0.06	118	0.05
Batanes	1,897	30.07	1,853	29.38	360	5.71	31	0.49	2,011	31.88	83	1.32	38	0.60	27	0.43	2	0.03	6	0.10
Batangas	129,929	17.09	22,858	3.01	25,120	3.30	2,714	0.36	17,803	2.34	556,709	73.21	3,069	0.40	1,514	0.20	328	0.04	358	0.05
Benguet	40,987	36.55	34,020	30.34	14,843	13.24	668	0.60	13,924	12.42	4,156	3.71	2,318	2.07	945	0.84	167	0.15	99	0.09
Biliran	15,128	30.74	14,182	28.82	973	1.98	16,802	34.15	954	1.94	892	1.81	105	0.21	77	0.16	60	0.12	32	0.07
Bohol	103,451	25.86	60,010	15.00	27,647	6.91	165,168	41.29	29,997	7.50	10,387	2.60	1,803	0.45	492	0.12	879	0.22	218	0.05
Bukidnon	78,162	23.83	75,631	23.06	7,546	2.30	142,890	43.56	15,818	4.82	4,100	1.25	2,782	0.85	661	0.20	289	0.09	166	0.05
Bulacan	388,651	50.39	71,330	9.25	122,750	15.92	7,779	1.01	158,395	20.54	10,708	1.39	8,303	1.08	2,068	0.27	699	0.09	594	0.08
Cagayan	60,027	18.14	34,639	10.47	8,565	2.59	751	0.23	5,200	1.57	1,902	0.57	780	0.24	218,865	66.13	143	0.04	92	0.03
Cagayan de Oro	74,611	43.13	22,501	13.01	9,077	5.25	38,185	22.07	19,650	11.36	5,996	3.47	1,876	1.08	586	0.34	291	0.17	215	0.12
Caloocan	156,749	41.18	45,700	12.00	94,646	24.86	12,270	3.22	50,681	13.31	9,560	2.51	8,297	2.18	1,958	0.51	371	0.10	443	0.12
Camarines Norte	34,806	22.06	6,835	4.33	113,153	71.73	202	0.13	1,387	0.88	902	0.57	240	0.15	149	0.09	7	0.00	67	0.04
Camarines Sur	35,879	6.99	16,568	3.23	454,896	88.62	373	0.07	2,381	0.46	2,545	0.50	366	0.07	145	0.03	42	0.01	104	0.02
Camiguin	16,004	41.93	15,332	40.17	751	1.97	3,548	9.30	1,994	5.22	373	0.98	114	0.30	24	0.06	25	0.07	1	0.00
Capiz	127,307	53.25	20,965	8.77	13,362	5.59	3,237	1.35	27,368	11.45	1,525	0.64	44,406	18.57	266	0.11	581	0.24	73	0.03
Catanduanes	18,072	23.47	11,333	14.72	46,109	59.88	42	0.05	603	0.78	686	0.89	120	0.16	30	0.04	4	0.01	8	0.01
Cavite	360,239	48.68	99,362	13.43	134,418	18.16	15,225	2.06	85,017	11.49	31,443	4.25	9,859	1.33	3,009	0.41	689	0.09	818	0.11
Cebu	118,296	11.88	88,529	8.89	14,805	1.49	727,884	73.13	32,461	3.26	5,282	0.53	3,296	0.33	1,326	0.13	3,136	0.32	379	0.04
Cebu City	68,732	22.54	11,615	3.81	14,137	4.64	175,468	57.54	26,893	8.82	2,550	0.84	2,273	0.75	553	0.18	2,558	0.84	149	0.05
Compostela Valley	86,459	48.07	25,889	14.40	6,711	3.73	47,277	26.29	7,265	4.04	3,984	2.22	1,663	0.92	280	0.16	202	0.11	117	0.07
Cotabato	146,457	48.75	55,083	18.33	14,929	4.97	42,299	14.08	17,307	5.76	12,360	4.11	10,268	3.42	835	0.28	676	0.23	213	0.07
Cotabato City	28,769	59.93	5,870	12.23	2,832	5.90	1,324	2.76	4,814	10.03	2,496	5.20	407	0.85	228	0.47	1,184	2.47	81	0.17
Davao City	195,905	44.08	38,326	8.62	49,510	11.14	104,976	23.62	33,823	7.61	15,288	3.44	4,251	0.96	1,267	0.29	661	0.15	384	0.09
Davao del Norte	118,769	47.40	25,186	10.05	13,487	5.38	66,176	26.41	9,312	3.72	13,842	5.52	3,082	1.23	386	0.15	206	0.08	113	0.05
Davao del Sur	113,824	48.68	23,268	9.95	6,584	2.82	75,642	32.35	9,208	3.94	3,470	1.48	1,211	0.52	341	0.15	220	0.09	67	0.03
Davao Oriental	73,464	49.17	23,192	15.52	4,426	2.96	39,552	26.47	4,241	2.84	2,982	2.00	679	0.45	578	0.39	136	0.09	148	0.10
Eastern Samar	72,505	55.26	26,841	20.46	3,267	2.49	14,065	10.72	12,655	9.65	730	0.56	859	0.65	164	0.12	81	0.06	39	0.03
Guimaras	14,316	27.82	13,098	25.45	2,103	4.09	1,006	1.95	3,149	6.12	392	0.76	17,303	33.62	55	0.11	20	0.04	23	0.04
Ifugao	30,388	57.28	10,938	20.62	3,733	7.04	723	1.36	4,153	7.83	1,644	3.10	374	0.70	993	1.87	71	0.13	36	0.07
Ilocos Norte	146,983	69.72	39,001	18.50	8,129	3.86	778	0.37	4,478	2.12	4,848	2.30	1,353	0.64	4,902	2.33	259	0.12	80	0.04
Ilocos Sur	130,389	56.64	75,441	32.77	8,193	3.56	1,088	0.47	9,334	4.05	2,195	0.95	1,196	0.52	2,135	0.93	160	0.07	91	0.04
Iloilo	106,042	18.67	53,709	9.46	28,518	5.02	10,787	1.90	45,765	8.06	5,008	0.88	317,032	55.82	738	0.13	224	0.04	141	0.02
Iloilo City	29,148	18.52	12,230	7.77	13,922	8.85	3,708	2.36	24,745	15.72	1,504	0.96	71,478	45.42	412	0.26	155	0.10	67	0.04
Isabela	268,363	60.75	104,933	23.75	23,725	5.37	1,277	0.29	16,285	3.69	3,500	0.79	2,169	0.49	20,616	4.67	518	0.12	381	0.09
Kalinga	24,786	42.08	18,940	32.16	4,193	7.12	312	0.53	2,961	5.03	1,738	2.95	602	1.02	5,221	8.86	88	0.15	61	0.10
La Union	162,760	61.56	63,866	24.16	19,147	7.24	1,374	0.52	9,593	3.63	3,980	1.51	2,151	0.81	1,219	0.46	211	0.08	70	0.03
Laguna	394,806	51.34	67,013	8.71	144,827	18.83	9,809	1.28	79,948	10.40	60,083	7.81	8,573	1.11	2,408	0.31	872	0.11	691	0.09
Lanao del Norte	96,602	37.37	63,339	24.50	6,180	2.39	66,463	25.71	17,177	6.64	6,365	2.46	999	0.39	649	0.25	407	0.16	327	0.13
Lanao del Sur	—	—	—	—	—	—	—	—	—	—	—	—	—	—	—	—	—	—	—	—
Las Piñas	54,627	33.62	19,981	12.30	42,694	26.28	5,995	3.69	26,368	16.23	7,178	4.42	4,082	2.51	1,018	0.63	302	0.19	220	0.14
Leyte	222,701	40.18	61,902	11.17	14,335	2.59	224,177	40.44	22,695	4.09	5,473	0.99	1,892	0.34	508	0.09	334	0.06	286	0.05
Maguindanao	124,517	57.03	72,573	33.24	3,275	1.50	1,872	0.86	4,577	2.10	8,437	3.86	1,866	0.85	2.033	0.00	861	0.39	340	0.16
Makati	90,652	34.31	31,110	11.77	73,309	27.75	9,567	3.62	36,787	13.92	12,564	4.76	6,736	2.55	2,873	1.09	357	0.14	258	0.10
Malabon–Navotas	—	—	—	—	—	—	—	—	—	—	—	—	—	—	—	—	—	—	—	—
Mandaluyong	45,293	36.20	14,919	11.92	33,867	27.06	3,599	2.88	18,361	14.67	4,638	3.71	3,549	2.84	674	0.54	120	0.10	114	0.09
Manila	255,618	35.12	66,472	9.13	161,481	22.19	17,306	2.38	189,128	25.99	18,522	2.54	13,138	1.81	4,152	0.57	777	0.11	1,186	0.16
Marikina	68,990	40.64	17,935	10.57	48,949	28.84	3,462	2.04	20,970	12.35	5,411	3.19	2,718	1.60	974	0.57	144	0.08	188	0.11
Marinduque	50,216	61.06	10,441	12.70	8,426	10.25	306	0.37	7,170	8.72	4,684	5.70	619	0.75	118	0.14	225	0.27	38	0.05
Masbate	67,307	31.15	30,185	13.97	38,361	17.75	64,474	29.84	6,693	3.10	7,307	3.38	1,188	0.55	352	0.16	141	0.07	72	0.03
Misamis Occidental	35,575	18.60	45,652	23.87	4,632	2.42	64,504	33.72	24,024	12.56	15,290	7.99	650	0.34	700	0.37	122	0.06	116	0.06
Misamis Oriental	115,551	45.67	61,378	24.26	4,998	1.98	47,844	18.91	16,022	6.33	5,436	2.15	1,040	0.41	425	0.17	135	0.05	186	0.07
Mountain Province	21,068	42.14	13,465	26.93	4,937	9.87	342	0.68	7,204	14.41	1,394	2.79	934	1.87	492	0.98	78	0.16	84	0.17
Muntinlupa	55,199	38.76	15,522	10.90	36,616	25.71	4,351	3.06	18,714	13.14	7,555	5.30	3,197	2.24	790	0.55	352	0.25	120	0.08
Negros Occidental	339,967	45.35	80,834	10.78	15,307	2.04	167,854	22.39	75,963	10.13	37,070	4.94	30,824	4.11	1,106	0.15	375	0.05	369	0.05
Negros Oriental	117,359	33.13	82,868	23.40	7,464	2.11	106,303	30.01	27,542	7.78	7,281	2.06	2,422	0.68	444	0.13	2,319	0.65	193	0.05
Northern Samar	89,840	56.92	14,480	9.17	3,102	1.97	5,951	3.77	40,942	25.94	2,913	1.85	386	0.24	162	0.10	17	0.01	49	0.03
Nueva Ecija	483,821	71.95	81,288	12.09	36,669	5.45	2,248	0.33	48,248	7.17	13,971	2.08	4,071	0.61	1,588	0.24	270	0.04	280	0.04
Nueva Vizcaya	77,170	57.97	30,596	22.98	10,109	7.59	490	0.37	4,644	3.49	2,671	2.01	1,140	0.86	6,027	4.53	198	0.15	74	0.06
Occidental Mindoro	69,614	62.31	16,340	14.63	6,781	6.07	767	0.69	9,953	8.91	5,590	5.00	2,122	1.90	404	0.36	32	0.03	116	0.10
Oriental Mindoro	146,009	66.23	21,213	9.62	12,749	5.78	1,316	0.60	10,305	4.67	27,041	12.27	1,167	0.53	480	0.22	80	0.04	81	0.04
Palawan	128,616	57.65	48,483	21.73	13,492	6.05	4,052	1.82	17,035	7.64	4,835	2.17	4,777	2.14	1,578	0.71	167	0.07	79	0.04
Pampanga	243,760	33.43	155,851	21.38	187,871	25.77	5,211	0.71	116,538	15.98	10,752	1.47	6,801	0.93	1,311	0.18	572	0.08	435	0.06
Pangasinan	204,709	21.76	670,396	71.27	26,271	2.79	2,157	0.23	17,259	1.83	14,035	1.49	2,890	0.31	2,231	0.24	366	0.04	346	0.04
Parañaque	67,382	33.81	23,307	11.70	51,655	25.92	8,650	4.34	31,025	15.57	9,869	4.95	5,322	2.67	1,531	0.77	335	0.17	193	0.10
Pasay	59,438	36.19	16,732	10.19	43,219	26.32	11,468	6.98	20,343	12.39	7,128	4.34	4,441	2.70	1,065	0.65	165	0.10	225	0.14
Pasig	81,363	37.68	19,727	9.14	62,903	29.13	6,507	3.01	29,263	13.55	7,603	3.52	6,267	2.90	1,838	0.85	246	0.11	199	0.09
Quezon	328,054	56.21	43,278	7.42	78,979	13.53	4,565	0.78	37,295	6.39	85,153	14.59	3,494	0.60	1,696	0.29	335	0.06	753	0.13
Quezon City	290,444	35.33	89,227	10.85	225,513	27.43	32,779	3.99	120,340	14.64	33,971	4.13	19,747	2.40	7,511	0.91	1,130	0.14	1,379	0.17
Quirino	35,109	61.77	14,610	25.71	3,093	5.44	147	0.26	1,283	2.26	507	0.89	280	0.49	1,737	3.06	56	0.10	13	0.02
Rizal	273,632	49.07	53,080	9.52	126,327	22.66	10,589	1.90	65,534	11.75	15,988	2.87	8,984	1.61	2,364	0.42	487	0.09	599	0.11
Romblon	42,862	46.96	28,640	31.37	7,208	7.90	838	0.92	3,795	4.16	6,813	7.46	832	0.91	76	0.08	155	0.17	64	0.07
Samar	107,787	48.00	47,996	21.37	5,247	2.34	22,791	10.15	38,891	17.32	861	0.38	613	0.27	260	0.12	39	0.02	69	0.03
San Juan	27,165	45.98	5,942	10.06	12,558	21.26	1,291	2.19	8,667	14.67	2,025	3.43	947	1.60	322	0.55	90	0.15	68	0.12
Sarangani	61,243	55.43	25,781	23.33	2,245	2.03	11,187	10.13	4,462	4.04	4,494	4.07	772	0.70	211	0.19	60	0.05	31	0.03
Siquijor	10,112	29.32	15,505	44.96	616	1.79	6,285	18.23	1,254	3.64	482	1.40	111	0.32	34	0.10	73	0.21	11	0.03
Sorsogon	52,849	22.72	14,334	6.16	159,636	68.63	248	0.11	3,993	1.72	926	0.40	313	0.13	252	0.11	19	0.01	45	0.02
South Cotabato	202,260	55.00	35,151	9.56	21,501	5.85	65,027	17.68	22,605	6.15	7,048	1.92	12,600	3.43	1,164	0.32	330	0.09	83	0.02
Southern Leyte	31,770	23.58	32,899	24.42	1,740	1.29	60,611	44.98	5,461	4.05	1,561	1.16	374	0.28	94	0.07	190	0.14	48	0.04
Sultan Kudarat	99,983	58.63	30,223	17.72	7,259	4.26	18,901	11.08	6,325	3.71	2,472	1.45	4,884	2.86	204	0.12	177	0.10	105	0.06
Sulu	—	—	—	—	—	—	—	—	—	—	—	—	—	—	—	—	—	—	—	—
Surigao del Norte	39,763	23.01	40,190	23.25	1,932	1.12	75,515	43.69	12,415	7.18	2,227	1.29	406	0.23	199	0.12	151	0.09	43	0.02
Surigao del Sur	58,116	32.39	31,005	17.28	1,891	1.05	81,552	45.46	4,511	2.51	813	0.45	782	0.44	191	0.11	262	0.15	284	0.16
Taguig–Pateros	75,610	40.57	23,018	12.35	47,340	25.40	7,132	3.83	19,693	10.57	6,862	3.68	4,915	2.64	1,395	0.75	314	0.17	110	0.06
Tarlac	236,317	55.29	60,536	14.16	52,476	12.28	1,592	0.37	59,865	14.01	10,544	2.47	4,341	1.02	1,395	0.33	205	0.05	156	0.04
Tawi-Tawi	33,000	50.03	26,432	40.07	678	1.03	459	0.70	3,586	5.44	778	1.18	257	0.39	414	0.63	140	0.21	216	0.33
Valenzuela	76,027	42.04	19,713	10.90	44,552	24.63	5,753	3.18	25,911	14.33	3,439	1.90	4,272	2.36	880	0.49	147	0.08	170	0.09
Zambales	138,368	50.95	63,753	23.48	34,011	12.52	2,516	0.93	17,796	6.55	9,414	3.47	4,379	1.61	887	0.33	288	0.11	143	0.05
Zamboanga City	73,036	39.79	19,030	10.37	12,191	6.64	23,123	12.60	45,696	24.89	6,380	3.48	2,925	1.59	715	0.39	264	0.14	201	0.11
Zamboanga del Norte	85,426	30.11	57,568	20.29	7,237	2.55	108,180	38.13	12,832	4.52	10,791	3.80	1,065	0.38	250	0.09	199	0.07	163	0.06
Zamboanga del Sur	186,821	45.66	98,904	24.17	7,509	1.84	81,668	19.96	20,820	5.09	10,956	2.68	1,574	0.38	404	0.10	205	0.05	305	0.07
Absentee voters	63	8.22	86	11.23	139	18.15	24	3.13	62	8.09	367	47.91	12	1.57	13	1.70	0	0.00	0	0.00
Total	10,722,295	39.86	4,268,483	15.87	3,720,212	13.83	3,347,631	12.44	2,344,362	8.71	1,308,352	4.86	797,206	2.96	343,139	1.28	32,212	0.12	18,644	0.07

== Vice presidential election ==
Candidate	Party	Votes	%
Gloria Macapagal Arroyo	Lakas–NUCD–UMDP	12,667,252	49.56
Edgardo Angara	Laban ng Makabayang Masang Pilipino	5,652,068	22.11
Oscar Orbos	Partido para sa Demokratikong Reporma–Lapiang Manggagawa	3,321,779	13.00
Serge Osmeña	Liberal Party	2,351,462	9.20
Francisco Tatad	Grand Alliance for Democracy	745,389	2.92
Ismael Sueno	PROMDI	537,677	2.10
Irene Santiago	Aksyon Demokratiko	240,210	0.94
Camilo Sabio	Partido Bansang Marangal	22,010	0.09
Reynaldo Pacheco	Kilusan para sa Pambansang Pagpapanibago	21,422	0.08
Total		25,559,269	100.00
Valid votes		25,559,269	87.28
Invalid/blank votes		3,726,506	12.72
Total votes		29,285,775	100.00
Registered voters/turnout		33,873,665	86.46

Province/City	Arroyo		Angara		Orbos		Osmeña		Tatad		Sueno		Santiago		Sabio		Pacheco	
Province/City	Votes	%	Votes	%	Votes	%	Votes	%	Votes	%	Votes	%	Votes	%	Votes	%	Votes	%
Abra	47,853	64.12	16,923	22.68	8,545	11.45	822	1.10	280	0.38	9	0.01	155	0.21	17	0.02	27	0.04
Agusan del Norte	109,336	55.31	60,412	30.56	3,449	1.74	21,396	10.82	461	0.23	1,370	0.69	753	0.38	312	0.16	190	0.10
Agusan del Sur	92,332	56.70	47,993	29.47	1,564	0.96	14,248	8.75	3,263	2.00	2,501	1.54	491	0.30	323	0.20	122	0.07
Aklan	57,915	36.43	71,869	45.21	3,876	2.44	18,916	11.90	5,291	3.33	127	0.08	730	0.46	113	0.07	133	0.08
Albay	135,839	37.99	42,963	12.01	21,871	6.12	9,572	2.68	130,432	36.48	93	0.03	16,561	4.63	125	0.03	130	0.04
Antique	91,795	60.33	39,199	25.76	3,694	2.43	9,909	6.51	6,067	3.99	232	0.15	1,104	0.73	33	0.02	130	0.09
Apayao	19,400	74.16	5,601	21.41	689	2.63	284	1.09	72	0.28	4	0.02	85	0.32	11	0.04	14	0.05
Aurora	20,546	32.82	40,380	64.50	1,104	1.76	351	0.56	155	0.25	4	0.01	48	0.08	6	0.01	13	0.02
Bacolod	65,868	39.56	43,432	26.09	13,645	8.20	37,917	22.77	3,105	1.86	1,318	0.79	1,050	0.63	88	0.05	77	0.05
Baguio	44,248	48.17	15,503	16.88	24,840	27.04	5,469	5.95	1,092	1.19	46	0.05	576	0.63	49	0.05	43	0.05
Basilan	69,159	67.18	22,737	22.08	3,158	3.07	6,986	6.79	426	0.41	275	0.27	144	0.14	29	0.03	39	0.04
Bataan	126,653	53.94	47,172	20.09	46,824	19.94	10,745	4.58	1,386	0.59	40	0.02	1,572	0.67	201	0.09	189	0.08
Batanes	4,252	71.16	671	11.23	144	2.41	873	14.61	12	0.20	7	0.12	13	0.22	3	0.05	0	0.00
Batangas	211,464	29.21	113,319	15.66	363,854	50.27	27,020	3.73	5,467	0.76	132	0.02	1,566	0.22	840	0.12	172	0.02
Benguet	73,779	67.18	18,693	17.02	12,159	11.07	3,217	2.93	1,356	1.23	33	0.03	500	0.46	39	0.04	45	0.04
Biliran	30,846	69.63	8,828	19.93	761	1.72	2,080	4.70	116	0.26	1,573	3.55	69	0.16	10	0.02	18	0.04
Bohol	203,234	56.13	78,923	21.80	10,888	3.01	57,995	16.02	2,420	0.67	5,987	1.65	1,952	0.54	224	0.06	451	0.12
Bukidnon	230,729	72.14	33,263	10.40	5,960	1.86	39,982	12.50	648	0.20	5,965	1.86	1,206	0.38	1,857	0.58	245	0.08
Bulacan	339,239	45.78	183,230	24.72	134,101	18.09	70,731	9.54	8,570	1.16	236	0.03	4,356	0.59	132	0.02	505	0.07
Cagayan	205,292	68.48	67,215	22.42	18,751	6.25	5,681	1.90	1,335	0.45	108	0.04	1,101	0.37	139	0.05	158	0.05
Cagayan de Oro	80,251	46.79	43,080	25.12	11,510	6.71	29,068	16.95	1,917	1.12	784	0.46	841	0.49	3,739	2.18	314	0.18
Caloocan	156,586	39.87	91,307	23.25	88,020	22.41	40,281	10.26	12,785	3.26	346	0.09	2,966	0.76	228	0.06	181	0.05
Camarines Norte	76,266	50.49	24,643	16.32	8,066	5.34	2,954	1.96	32,456	21.49	10	0.01	6,566	4.35	60	0.04	21	0.01
Camarines Sur	160,561	34.66	62,579	13.51	19,638	4.24	4,807	1.04	136,018	29.36	381	0.08	79,044	17.06	153	0.03	100	0.02
Camiguin	20,872	62.11	9,459	28.15	399	1.19	2,550	7.59	79	0.24	57	0.17	57	0.17	124	0.37	9	0.03
Capiz	102,022	48.07	69,802	32.89	6,812	3.21	27,146	12.79	4,373	2.06	423	0.20	1,150	0.54	141	0.07	387	0.18
Catanduanes	19,202	26.16	4,872	6.64	1,924	2.62	210	0.29	46,828	63.80	9	0.01	310	0.42	35	0.05	6	0.01
Cavite	324,963	44.58	202,048	27.72	119,278	16.36	63,554	8.72	12,932	1.77	532	0.07	4,802	0.66	341	0.05	434	0.06
Cebu	253,344	33.98	107,450	14.41	16,722	2.24	200,512	26.89	4,955	0.66	157,145	21.08	3,070	0.41	306	0.04	2,053	0.28
Cebu City	105,838	34.80	48,819	16.05	14,162	4.66	87,033	28.61	15,584	5.12	29,513	9.70	1,430	0.47	141	0.05	1,652	0.54
Compostela Valley	112,865	62.75	34,551	19.21	4,601	2.56	23,628	13.14	679	0.38	1,743	0.97	1,122	0.62	468	0.26	198	0.11
Cotabato	175,550	59.73	55,849	19.00	10,884	3.70	26,440	9.00	1,959	0.67	20,883	7.11	1,773	0.60	160	0.05	407	0.14
Cotabato City	23,737	50.31	14,154	30.00	3,945	8.36	3,799	8.05	252	0.53	317	0.67	163	0.35	25	0.05	785	1.66
Davao City	183,482	41.83	106,509	24.28	37,932	8.65	91,371	20.83	3,595	0.82	3,199	0.73	10,993	2.51	1,173	0.27	410	0.09
Davao del Norte	142,417	56.39	47,607	18.85	18,996	7.52	35,422	14.02	1,381	0.55	3,036	1.20	2,625	1.04	946	0.37	137	0.05
Davao del Sur	112,869	50.58	63,080	28.27	8,271	3.71	32,123	14.40	1,012	0.45	3,876	1.74	1,567	0.70	156	0.07	187	0.08
Davao Oriental	84,991	59.62	35,170	24.67	3,886	2.73	14,903	10.45	381	0.27	1,761	1.24	928	0.65	421	0.30	104	0.07
Eastern Samar	93,969	75.02	17,381	13.88	1,597	1.27	10,978	8.76	870	0.69	187	0.15	184	0.15	51	0.04	39	0.03
Guimaras	27,334	60.35	10,765	23.77	766	1.69	3,639	8.03	2,330	5.14	129	0.28	317	0.70	6	0.01	4	0.01
Ifugao	31,413	61.19	15,255	29.72	3,173	6.18	1,068	2.08	187	0.36	47	0.09	152	0.30	21	0.04	19	0.04
Ilocos Norte	97,349	46.81	81,746	39.31	23,787	11.44	3,178	1.53	1,103	0.53	48	0.02	624	0.30	39	0.02	87	0.04
Ilocos Sur	125,448	54.98	73,988	32.43	19,991	8.76	3,790	1.66	4,179	1.83	36	0.02	452	0.20	189	0.08	86	0.04
Iloilo	240,247	46.35	145,907	28.15	15,557	3.00	56,729	10.94	49,047	9.46	6,697	1.29	3,348	0.65	556	0.11	238	0.05
Iloilo City	61,345	41.00	38,575	25.78	8,122	5.43	23,697	15.84	15,756	10.53	840	0.56	1,116	0.75	95	0.06	76	0.05
Isabela	278,170	66.06	100,827	23.94	30,189	7.17	9,033	2.15	1,537	0.37	85	0.02	932	0.22	169	0.04	150	0.04
Kalinga	42,697	75.52	7,465	13.20	5,077	8.98	887	1.57	156	0.28	51	0.09	110	0.19	23	0.04	72	0.13
La Union	136,550	51.91	83,018	31.56	34,768	13.22	6,466	2.46	1,293	0.49	54	0.02	802	0.30	33	0.01	90	0.03
Laguna	315,764	42.77	213,961	28.98	130,945	17.74	57,943	7.85	12,846	1.74	439	0.06	5,391	0.73	441	0.06	598	0.08
Lanao del Norte	175,640	69.31	42,479	16.76	6,851	2.70	25,275	9.97	903	0.36	1,265	0.50	632	0.25	184	0.07	186	0.07
Lanao del Sur	—	—	—	—	—	—	—	—	—	—	—	—	—	—	—	—	—	—
Las Piñas	59,335	36.86	27,978	17.38	44,841	27.86	22,536	14.00	4,369	2.71	181	0.11	1,499	0.93	68	0.04	163	0.10
Leyte	279,796	57.66	113,373	23.36	13,597	2.80	50,430	10.39	1,803	0.37	24,365	5.02	1,318	0.27	141	0.03	444	0.09
Maguindanao	151,126	71.83	41,613	19.78	4,818	2.29	6,854	3.26	1,516	0.72	2,730	1.30	1,049	0.50	204	0.10	486	0.23
Makati	92,788	35.21	57,937	21.99	74,714	28.35	28,281	10.73	7,139	2.71	219	0.08	2,100	0.80	135	0.05	207	0.08
Malabon–Navotas	—	—	—	—	—	—	—	—	—	—	—	—	—	—	—	—	—	—
Mandaluyong	45,190	36.51	26,593	21.48	34,989	28.27	11,839	9.56	3,959	3.20	113	0.09	954	0.77	71	0.06	77	0.06
Manila	233,452	32.25	144,613	19.98	204,832	28.30	116,921	16.15	16,899	2.33	682	0.09	5,679	0.78	372	0.05	460	0.06
Marikina	56,662	35.64	33,862	21.30	45,523	28.64	15,261	9.60	5,597	3.52	104	0.07	1,820	1.14	76	0.05	67	0.04
Marinduque	41,398	53.99	26,204	34.17	5,457	7.12	2,862	3.73	397	0.52	11	0.01	203	0.26	16	0.02	129	0.17
Masbate	114,929	64.68	21,629	12.17	11,296	6.36	13,323	7.50	4,807	2.71	9,336	5.25	2,251	1.27	51	0.03	69	0.04
Misamis Occidental	98,256	55.02	18,270	10.23	16,050	8.99	42,155	23.61	907	0.51	1,926	1.08	633	0.35	225	0.13	145	0.08
Misamis Oriental	151,358	62.43	57,114	23.56	5,769	2.38	23,469	9.68	1,183	0.49	1,091	0.45	747	0.31	1,529	0.63	187	0.08
Mountain Province	31,012	65.60	10,537	22.29	3,553	7.52	1,272	2.69	359	0.76	38	0.08	368	0.78	91	0.19	41	0.09
Muntinlupa	59,033	41.87	27,323	19.38	34,999	24.83	14,433	10.24	3,534	2.51	118	0.08	1,272	0.90	81	0.06	187	0.13
Negros Occidental	343,238	50.22	188,499	27.58	31,039	4.54	101,035	14.78	5,648	0.83	10,231	1.50	2,829	0.41	500	0.07	386	0.06
Negros Oriental	192,257	60.57	60,005	18.90	9,504	2.99	48,283	15.21	957	0.30	3,499	1.10	1,101	0.35	47	0.01	1,774	0.56
Northern Samar	55,378	39.77	43,474	31.22	2,478	1.78	36,842	26.46	435	0.31	346	0.25	183	0.13	15	0.01	92	0.07
Nueva Ecija	329,953	50.37	245,303	37.44	57,983	8.85	17,627	2.69	2,992	0.46	45	0.01	933	0.14	61	0.01	223	0.03
Nueva Vizcaya	85,117	64.73	30,385	23.11	12,991	9.88	1,923	1.46	588	0.45	20	0.02	283	0.22	143	0.11	53	0.04
Occidental Mindoro	60,568	55.82	24,145	22.25	17,753	16.36	4,296	3.96	802	0.74	43	0.04	770	0.71	29	0.03	106	0.10
Oriental Mindoro	106,028	51.28	69,088	33.41	23,000	11.12	7,063	3.42	854	0.41	41	0.02	590	0.29	30	0.01	87	0.04
Palawan	123,155	59.16	64,775	31.11	8,539	4.10	8,855	4.25	1,475	0.71	136	0.07	1,126	0.54	34	0.02	86	0.04
Pampanga	614,035	85.49	42,060	5.86	38,247	5.32	19,099	2.66	2,121	0.30	123	0.02	2,266	0.32	94	0.01	250	0.03
Pangasinan	435,082	46.91	36,954	3.98	446,263	48.11	6,628	0.71	1,569	0.17	107	0.01	711	0.08	107	0.01	138	0.01
Parañaque	68,078	34.75	39,903	20.37	57,022	29.11	23,252	11.87	5,447	2.78	259	0.13	1,676	0.86	82	0.04	174	0.09
Pasay	55,274	34.15	34,084	21.06	46,368	28.65	18,492	11.43	5,351	3.31	629	0.39	1,454	0.90	88	0.05	94	0.06
Pasig	75,733	35.76	45,993	21.72	55,721	26.31	24,295	11.47	6,967	3.29	220	0.10	2,580	1.22	110	0.05	173	0.08
Quezon	213,246	38.31	270,787	48.65	46,852	8.42	16,983	3.05	6,004	1.08	222	0.04	2,188	0.39	183	0.03	193	0.03
Quezon City	276,693	34.08	144,193	17.76	268,738	33.10	83,382	10.27	29,384	3.62	833	0.10	7,457	0.92	721	0.09	606	0.07
Quirino	38,563	70.30	12,450	22.70	2,949	5.38	623	1.14	126	0.23	7	0.01	111	0.20	11	0.02	12	0.02
Rizal	230,686	42.27	143,284	26.26	103,550	18.98	47,261	8.66	14,450	2.65	439	0.08	5,470	1.00	266	0.05	294	0.05
Romblon	59,001	67.95	15,166	17.47	10,027	11.55	2,055	2.37	207	0.24	23	0.03	306	0.35	0	0.00	41	0.05
Samar	127,456	63.61	28,686	14.32	2,924	1.46	39,645	19.79	604	0.30	684	0.34	268	0.13	51	0.03	49	0.02
San Juan	16,180	27.57	17,426	29.69	17,735	30.22	5,305	9.04	1,433	2.44	59	0.10	432	0.74	30	0.05	85	0.14
Sarangani	57,082	53.93	31,805	30.05	2,224	2.10	6,713	6.34	338	0.32	7,294	6.89	252	0.24	13	0.01	125	0.12
Siquijor	23,294	73.44	5,974	18.83	321	1.01	1,811	5.71	29	0.09	190	0.60	65	0.20	3	0.01	31	0.10
Sorsogon	98,486	48.04	42,642	20.80	7,910	3.86	3,368	1.64	44,283	21.60	88	0.04	8,093	3.95	37	0.02	98	0.05
South Cotabato	105,271	29.04	75,186	20.74	7,273	2.01	26,343	7.27	2,976	0.82	143,895	39.69	1,277	0.35	144	0.04	160	0.04
Southern Leyte	83,487	67.59	23,743	19.22	1,939	1.57	10,959	8.87	328	0.27	2,690	2.18	185	0.15	52	0.04	135	0.11
Sultan Kudarat	81,809	46.37	37,796	21.42	3,530	2.00	4,562	2.59	587	0.33	47,350	26.84	443	0.25	256	0.15	107	0.06
Sulu	—	—	—	—	—	—	—	—	—	—	—	—	—	—	—	—	—	—
Surigao del Norte	122,471	73.60	14,935	8.97	2,460	1.48	23,610	14.19	408	0.25	2,176	1.31	237	0.14	34	0.02	81	0.05
Surigao del Sur	121,523	71.12	25,961	15.19	1,448	0.85	16,385	9.59	783	0.46	3,809	2.23	508	0.30	95	0.06	349	0.20
Taguig–Pateros	81,087	44.23	38,414	20.95	36,798	20.07	18,413	10.04	6,234	3.40	223	0.12	1,925	1.05	66	0.04	187	0.10
Tarlac	289,184	69.84	59,205	14.30	45,278	10.93	18,542	4.48	979	0.24	69	0.02	733	0.18	43	0.01	63	0.02
Tawi-Tawi	39,356	62.20	19,573	30.93	1,124	1.78	2,499	3.95	101	0.16	108	0.17	238	0.38	177	0.28	97	0.15
Valenzuela	73,386	40.87	38,845	21.63	41,269	22.98	19,594	10.91	4,679	2.61	113	0.06	1,439	0.80	108	0.06	116	0.06
Zambales	152,641	57.13	59,032	22.10	42,201	15.80	9,379	3.51	2,356	0.88	74	0.03	1,309	0.49	57	0.02	118	0.04
Zamboanga City	87,707	47.34	43,571	23.52	15,045	8.12	36,323	19.61	1,211	0.65	441	0.24	707	0.38	79	0.04	187	0.10
Zamboanga del Norte	158,716	64.24	47,607	19.27	9,708	3.93	24,908	10.08	371	0.15	3,952	1.60	1,563	0.63	92	0.04	147	0.06
Zamboanga del Sur	229,914	59.35	113,422	29.28	7,106	1.83	32,731	8.45	496	0.13	2,371	0.61	1,102	0.28	110	0.03	112	0.03
Absentee voters	282	37.50	79	10.51	297	39.49	64	8.51	21	2.79	1	0.13	8	1.06	0	0.00	0	0.00
Total	12,667,252	49.56	5,652,068	22.11	3,321,779	13.00	2,351,462	9.20	745,389	2.92	537,677	2.10	240,210	0.94	22,010	0.09	21,422	0.08
