= Joint session of the Congress of the Philippines =

Gathering of members of both houses of Congress

- Seals of the Senate (left) and of the House of Representatives (right)

History
- Founded: August 5, 1946 (79 years ago) (as Congress of the Philippines)

Leadership
- President of the Senate: Sherwin Gatchalian (NPC) since June 3, 2026
- Speaker of the House: Bojie Dy (PFP) since September 17, 2025

Structure
- Seats: 342 voting members: 24 senators; 318 representatives
- Senate political groups: NPC (6); Nacionalista (4); PDP (3); Akbayan (1); KANP (1); Lakas (1); Liberal (1); PMP (1); Independent (6)
- House of Representatives political groups: Lakas (77); Party-lists (64); NUP (55); PFP (53); NPC (32); Nacionalista (18); Liberal (6); HTL (3); MKTZNU (2); 1CEBU (1); CDP (1); LDP (1); Navoteño (1); UNA (1); Independent (2); Vacant (1)

Meeting place
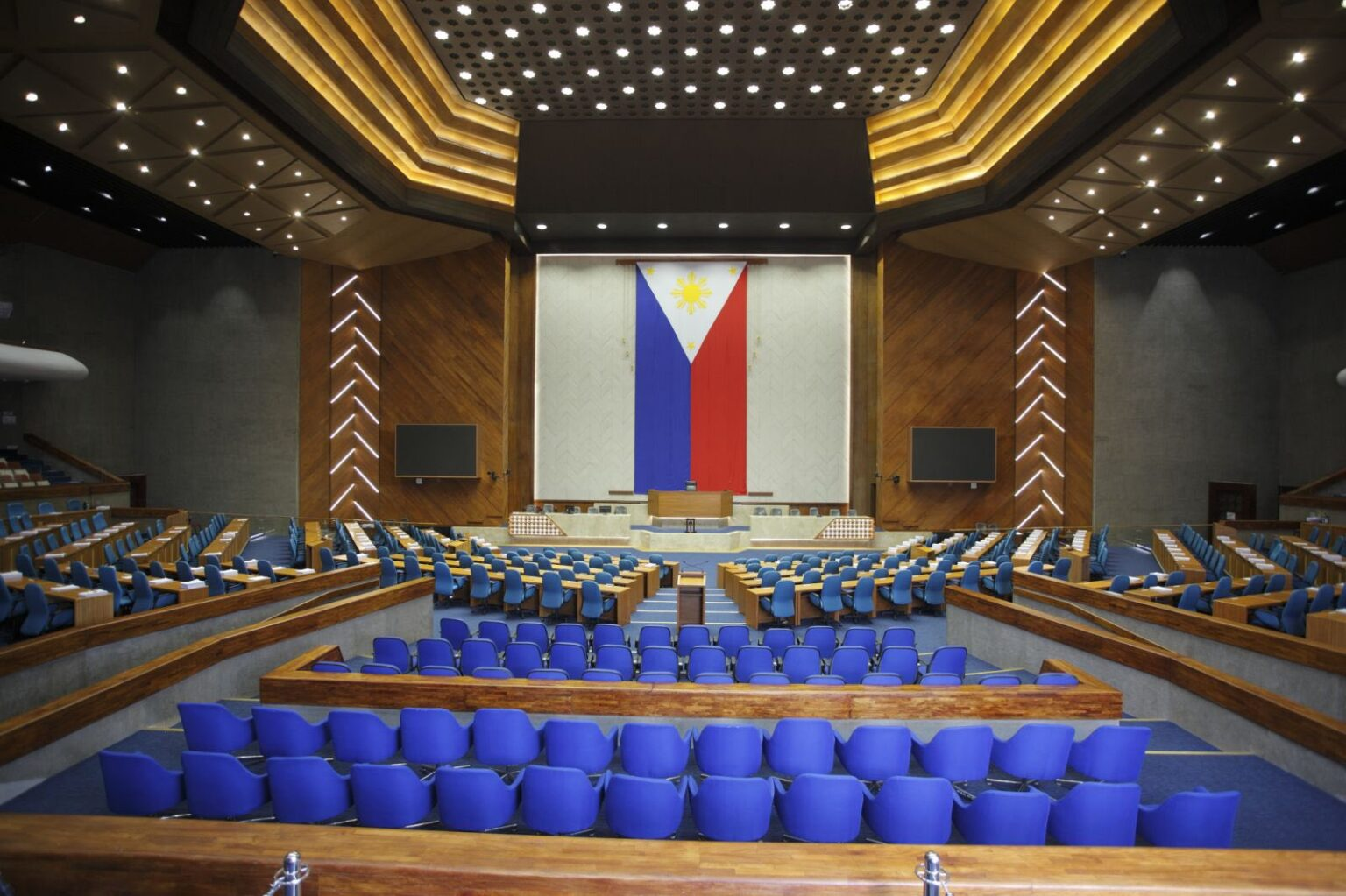
- Batasang Pambansa Complex, Batasan Hills, Quezon City, Philippines

Constitution
- Constitution of the Philippines

A joint session of the Congress of the Philippines is a gathering of members of the two chambers of the bicameral legislature of the government of the Philippines: the Senate and the House of Representatives.

== Background ==
A joint session can be convened for the following:

- To declare the existence of a state of war
- Canvassing of votes after a presidential election
- Every State of the Nation Address
- Revocation or extension of the
  - Proclamation of martial law, or
  - Suspension of the privilege of the writ of habeas corpus

== List of joint sessions ==
=== State of the Nation Addresses ===
	Congress	Date	President
First made before a joint session	1st (Commonwealth)	June 9, 1945	Sergio Osmeña
Most recent	20th	July 27, 2026	Bongbong Marcos

=== Receiving foreign dignitaries ===
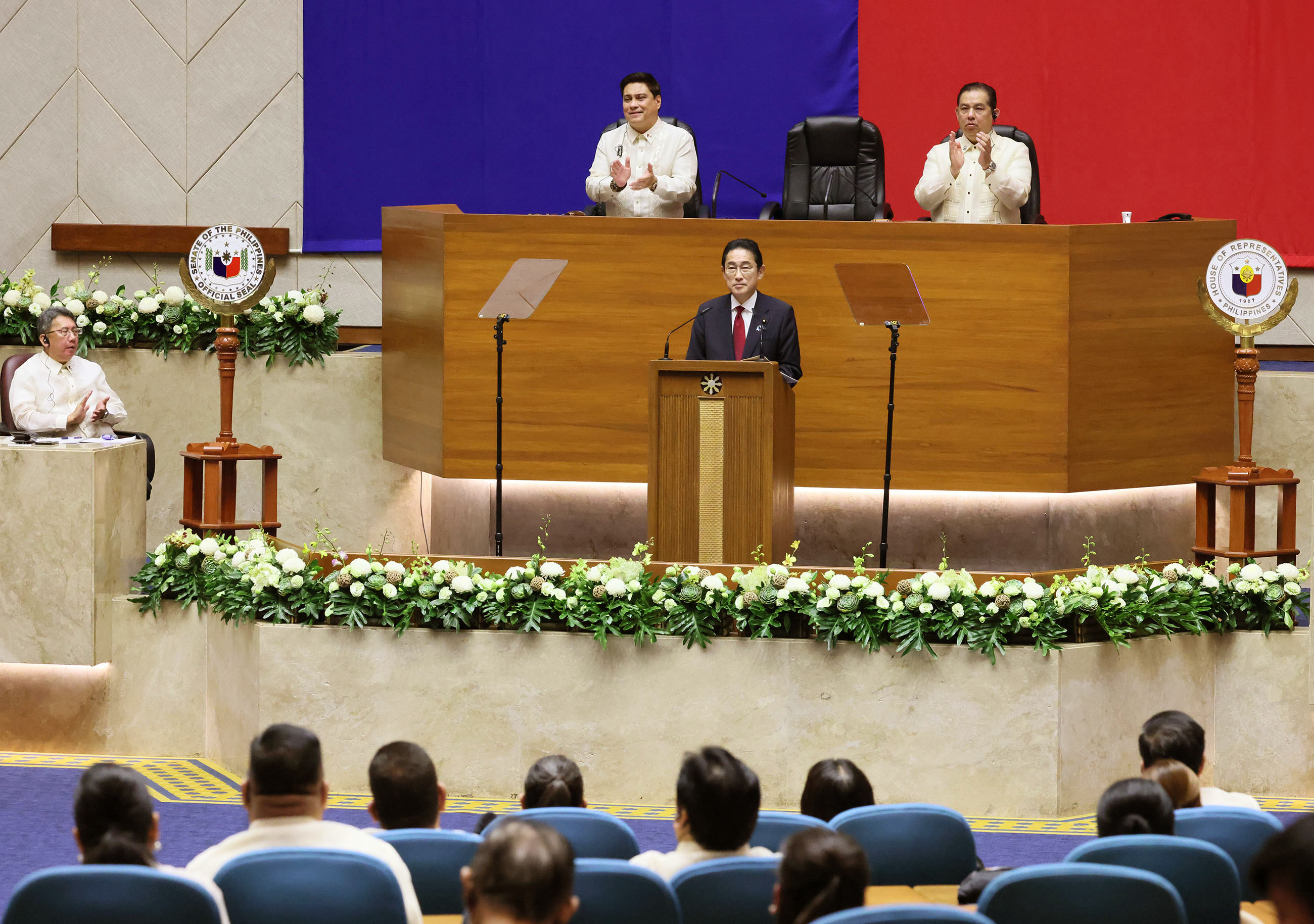
Japanese Prime Minister Fumio Kishida speaking at a Congress joint session in November 2023.

Special joint sessions can also be convened to facilitate visiting foreign leaders' addresses to Congress.

Congress	Date	Foreign dignitary			Notes
Congress	Date	Name	Country	Title	Notes
4th	June 15, 1960	Dwight Eisenhower	United States	President	Eisenhower spoke about the two countries' cooperation and mutual opposition toward communism.
12th	October 18, 2003	George W. Bush	United States	President	Bush underscored the military alliance of the United States and the Philippines as well as pledged to help the Philippines modernize its military.
13th	April 19, 2005	Pervez Musharraf	Pakistan	President	Musharraf addressed the Moro people to disavow terrorism and abandon secessionism. He also pledged Pakistan's support for Philippines' bid for observer status in the Organisation of Islamic Cooperation.
13th	April 27, 2005	Hu Jintao	China	President	Hu announced a "golden age" in Sino-Philippine ties and assured China is a good neighbor. He also emphasized the growth of the economic ties between China and ASEAN.
13th	February 6, 2006	A. P. J. Abdul Kalam	India	President	Kalam showcased the "Indo-Philippine Cooperation Roadmap" which proposed bolstering economic ties between India and the Philippines. He encouraged the Philippines to develop its solar power industry.
19th	November 4, 2023	Fumio Kishida	Japan	Prime Minister	Kishida pledged to further military cooperation between his country and the Philippines. He also touted cooperation between the two countries alongside the United States in guaranteeing "freedom in the South China Sea" (See Territorial disputes in the South China Sea).

== See also ==
- List of joint sessions of legislatures of the Philippines
