= Inauguration of Ferdinand Marcos =

Inauguration of Ferdinand Marcos may refer to:

- First inauguration of Ferdinand Marcos, 1965
- Second inauguration of Ferdinand Marcos, 1969
- Prime ministerial confirmation of Ferdinand Marcos, 1978
- Third inauguration of Ferdinand Marcos, 1981
- Fourth inauguration of Ferdinand Marcos, 1986
