= Philippine presidential inauguration =

Swearing into office of the President-elect of the Philippines

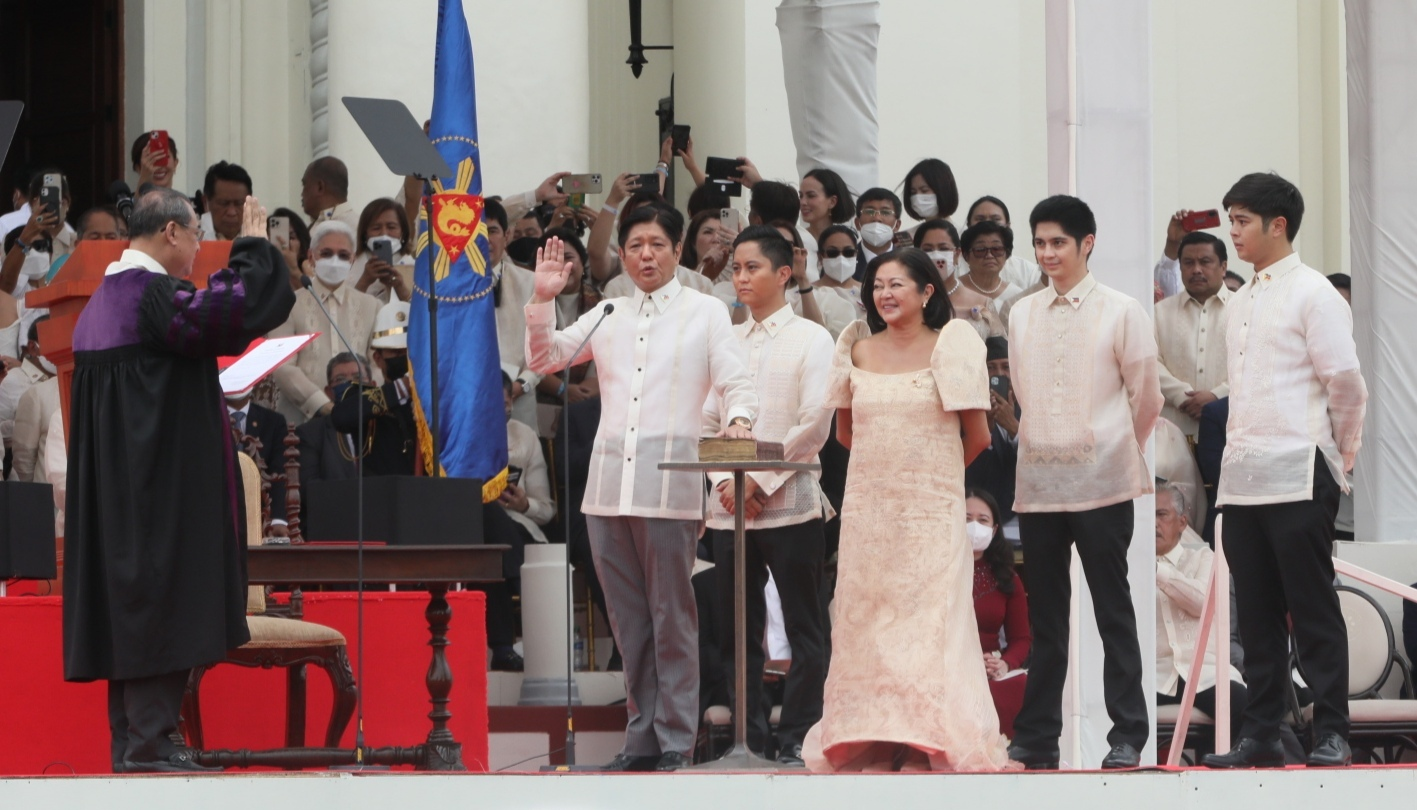
Bongbong Marcos taking the oath of office at National Museum of Fine Arts on June 30, 2022

The inauguration of the president of the Republic of the Philippines is a ceremony marking the commencement of the six-year term of a president of the Philippines, who is both head of state and head of government. The inauguration is performed on June 30, as mandated by the 1987 Constitution. Under the older 1935 Constitution, the date was December 30, which is also Rizal Day; the last inauguration held on the older date was Ferdinand Marcos' second one on December 30, 1969. The most recent public presidential inauguration ceremony was that of President Bongbong Marcos, who began his six-year term in office on Thursday, June 30, 2022.

The only inauguration element mandated by the Constitution is that the president-elect takes the oath, or makes an affirmation, before that person can "enter on the execution" of the office of the presidency. Over the years, various unofficial traditions have arisen that have expanded the inauguration from a simple oath-taking ceremony to a day-long event, including parades, speeches, and balls.

When a new president takes over mid-term due to the death, resignation, or deposition of another president, the oath of office is administered as soon as possible, and due to the sudden nature of such an event, formal public celebrations are not held.

== Inauguration rites ==
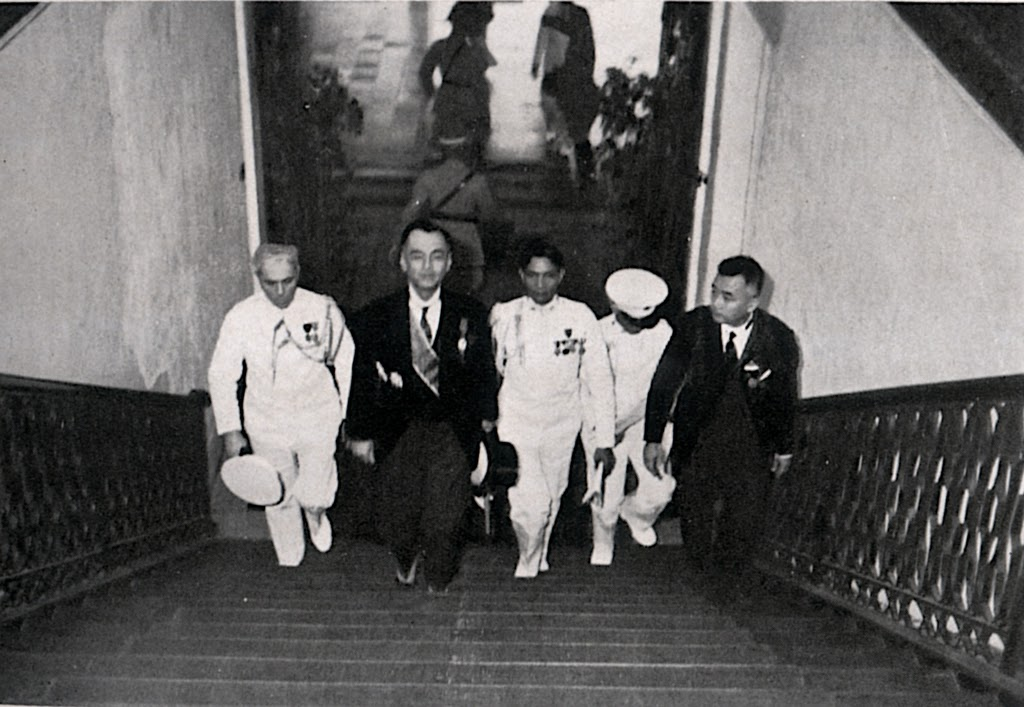
Manuel L. Quezon climbs up the Malacañang Palace stairs for the first time as President of the Philippines in 1935.

The ceremony since 1992 traditionally begins with the president-elect fetching the incumbent in Malacañang Palace on the morning of June 30. At the Palace's State Entrance, the president-elect will wait for the incumbent to descend the Grand Staircase. Upon meeting at the foot of the staircase, the president-elect would greet the incumbent.

Both travel to the Quirino Grandstand aboard any of the presidential cars. Following protocol, the outgoing president takes the back right-hand seat of the vehicle, while the president-elect is seated behind the chauffeur. At the Grandstand's parade grounds, the outgoing president will be welcomed with arrival honors, and then shake hands with the president-elect. The outgoing president conducts a final troop review and is presented to the public before departing the Grandstand aboard their own private vehicle. Corazon Aquino broke the custom of leaving the Grandstand immediately, choosing instead to stay until the end of Fidel Ramos's inaugural speech. Ramos also attended the oath-taking of Joseph Estrada and the inaugural ceremonies.

The inauguration proper then begins with the singing of the national anthem. An ecumenical invocation follows, led by leaders of the different major religions of the Philippines, followed by a patriotic musical piece by a musical ensemble. Afterward, the president of the Senate of the Philippines reads the Joint Resolution of the Joint Congressional Board of Canvassers proclaiming the newly elected president and vice president. Since the Third Republic, the vice-president-elect is sworn in before the president-elect to immediately secure the line of succession. During his inauguration, President Manuel L. Quezon took the oath of office first to mark a "new start".

As mandated by the Constitution, the president-elect then takes the oath of office at exactly 12:00 PST (GMT+8); in 2010, President-elect Aquino did not await noon, he instead took his oath moments after Vice-President-elect Binay finished doing so. The oath is customarily administered by the Chief Justice of the Supreme Court of the Philippines, but that is not required. Due to political differences, Benigno Aquino III instead had then-Associate Justice Conchita Carpio-Morales administer the oath instead of then-Chief Justice Renato Corona. A 21-gun salute is then immediately fired, followed by four ruffles and flourishes and the Presidential Anthem, We Say Mabuhay, is played in honor of the new president, followed by the presidential honors music Marangal na Parangal (Glorious Honors).

The new president then delivers an inaugural address. Previous inaugurations also saw a full military and civil parade in the same manner as the Independence Day celebrations on 12 June (similar to the US Inaugural Parades) right after the address. From the late 1940s to the late 1960s, similar parades were also held on Rizal Day on 30 December as well and to ring in the New Year's celebrations that would start the day after.

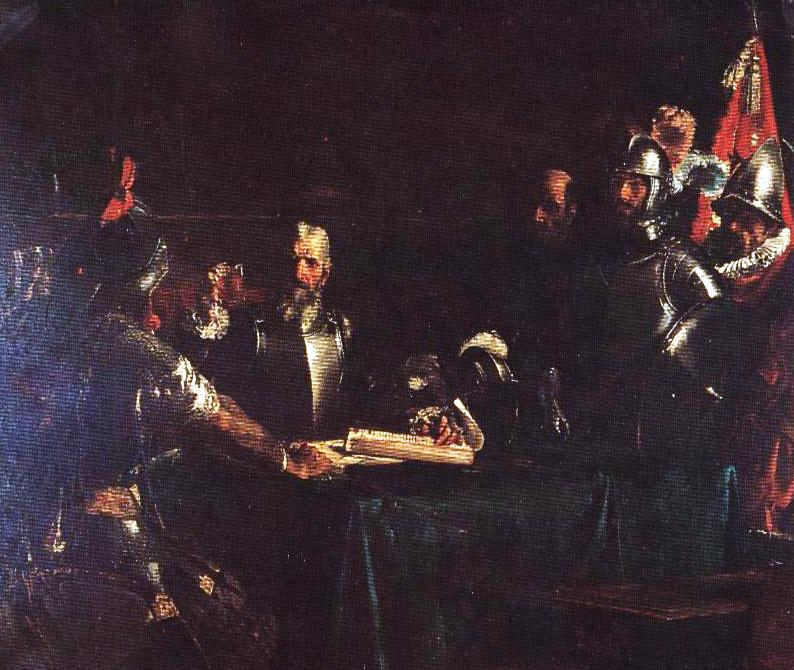
The Blood Compact by Juan Luna is displayed at the top of the Malacañang Palace's grand staircase and welcomes the incoming president every inauguration.

The new president then returns to Malacañang Palace to formally take possession of the residence. This formal entry is symbolized by the president ascending the Grand Staircase and proceeding to the Ceremonial Hall. Juan Luna's painting, The Blood Compact, is currently displayed at the top of the Staircase. The president then inducts the new Cabinet on the same day and holds its first meeting immediately after.

In the evening, an inaugural reception is held for other officials and foreign dignitaries who wish to call on the new president. The customary banquets of either a vin d'honneur or an inaugural ball were abolished in an effort to revert to the pre-martial law practice of simpler official receptions. The last inaugural ball was held in 1981 for Ferdinand Marcos' third inauguration, which was also the last time the Rigodon de Honor (a Hispanic dance analogous to a court dance) was performed; it was again danced on the Independence Day celebrations of 2009. The president concludes the ceremonies with a toast, as a gesture of amity towards states that maintain diplomatic ties with the Philippines.

=== Date ===
The new president is to be inaugurated at noon of June 30 as currently mandated by the 1987 Constitution, but past ceremonies were held on different dates. The first president, Emilio Aguinaldo, was inaugurated on January 23, 1899, while presidents under the 1935 Constitution were inaugurated at noon of Rizal Day (December 30). Only two presidents under the 1935 Constitution were not inaugurated on December 30, namely Sergio Osmeña and Manuel Roxas. Ferdinand Marcos changed the inauguration date to the present June 30, while his successors Corazon Aquino and Gloria Macapagal Arroyo were inaugurated on February 25, 1986, and January 20, 2001, respectively, Aquino after the People Power Revolution and Arroyo after the Second EDSA Revolution.

=== Location ===
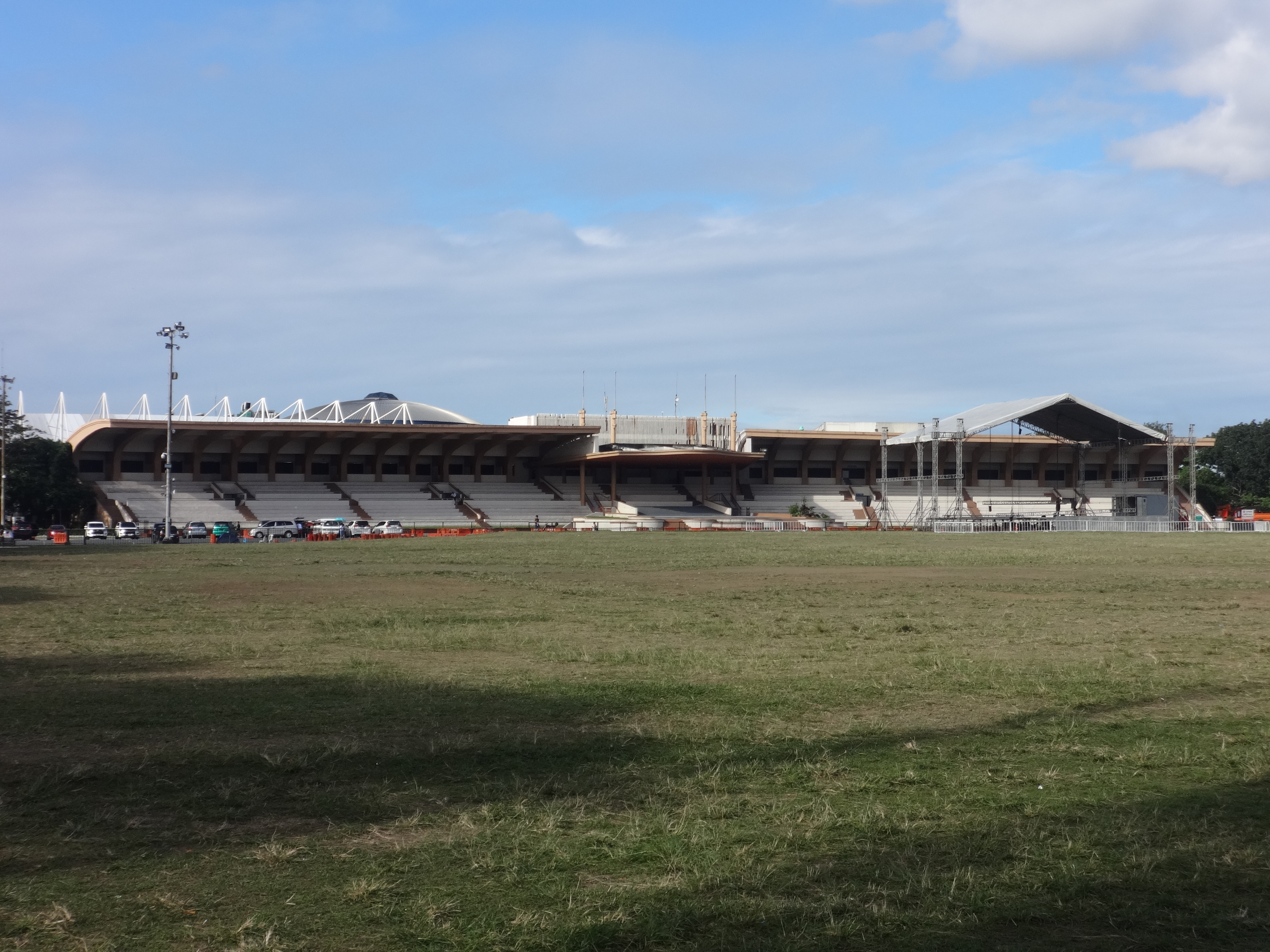
Quirino Grandstand is where most inaugurations have taken place.

Nine inaugurations have been held at the Quirino Grandstand in the Luneta, namely Quirino (1949), Magsaysay (1953), Garcia (December 1957), Macapagal (1961), Marcos (1965, 1969, 1981), Ramos (1992) and Aquino III (2010). Presidents Estrada and Arroyo only delivered their inaugural addresses there. To date, Estrada and Arroyo were the only presidents to take the oath of office and inaugural addresses in two different locations.

Other presidents, namely Aguinaldo and Estrada, were inaugurated at the Barasoain Church in Malolos, Bulacan; Quezon, Laurel, Roxas and Marcos Jr. were inaugurated in front of the Legislative Building (renamed as the National Museum of Fine Arts when Marcos Jr. was inaugurated); and Aquino in Club Filipino, Greenhills, San Juan, Metro Manila. Marcos was inaugurated in Maharlika Hall, Malacañang Palace in 1986, and Duterte was inaugurated in the Rizal Hall, Malacañang Palace in 2016. Arroyo took her first oath as president at the EDSA Shrine in Quezon City. Osmeña, who assumed the presidency upon the death of his predecessor Manuel L. Quezon, took his oath of office in Washington D.C. Quirino and Garcia took their first oath of office in the Quirino Council of State Room of the Malacañang Palace following the death of their predecessors.

List of venues that hosted inaugurations
Times hosted	Venue	Location	Ceremonies
10	Independence Grandstand / Quirino Grandstand	Manila, Metro Manila	1946, 1949, 1953, 1957, 1961, 1965, 1969, 1981, 1992, 2010
4	Malacañang Palace	Manila, Metro Manila	1948, 1957, 1986, 2016
4	Legislative Building / National Museum of Fine Arts	Manila, Metro Manila	1935, 1943, 1946, 2022
2	Barasoain Church	Malolos, Bulacan	1899, 1998
2	Washington, D.C.	United States	1943, 1944
1	Holy Cross Parish Church	Santa Cruz de Malabon, Cavite	1897
1	Malinta Tunnel	Corregidor, Cavite	1941
1	Club Filipino	San Juan, Metro Manila	1986
1	EDSA Shrine	Quezon City, Metro Manila	2001
1	Cebu Provincial Capitol	Cebu City, Cebu	2004

=== Attendees ===
In addition to the general public, the following are the attendants of the inauguration:

- The president and vice president elect and their immediate families.
- Members of Congress.
- Members of the President's Cabinet.
- The Chief Justice and Associate Justices of the Supreme Court.
- Local officials
- Representatives of different civil organizations.
- Members of the Diplomatic Corps.
- Usually the outgoing president and vice-president.
- Choir, orchestra, and other musical performers.
- Representatives of the various religions of the country.
- Security and uniformed personnel headed by the Presidential Security Group and the Philippine National Police.
- Military band, honor guard, and the uniformed personnel from the Armed Forces of the Philippines.

If a civil-military parade follows the speech the format is the same as in the Independence Day parades, with the AFP first, with the units of the Philippine National Police, Bureau of Fire Protection and the Philippine Coast Guard following them and later by civilian marchers representing the government, private sector, youth and youth uniformed organizations, national athletes and the representatives of the nation's religious sector and its various ethnic nationalities.

== Ceremonial ==
=== Oath of office ===
Video of Rodrigo Duterte taking his oath of office as the 16th president of the Philippines on June 30, 2016.

Under Article VII, Section 5 of the 1987 Constitution, before the president and vice-president can enter on the execution of their office, the President, the Vice-President, or the Acting President shall take the following oath or affirmation:

“I, _________ do solemnly swear (or affirm) that I will faithfully and conscientiously fulfill my duties as President (or Vice-President or Acting President) of the Philippines, preserve and defend its Constitution, execute its laws, do justice to every man, and consecrate myself to the service of the Nation. So help me God.” (In case of affirmation, last sentence will be omitted.)

The oath from the Filipino version of the Constitution was used for the inaugurations of Presidents Fidel V. Ramos, Joseph Estrada, Benigno Aquino III, and Bongbong Marcos:

Ako, si _______________, ay taimtim kong pinanunumpaan [o pinatotohanan] na tutuparin ko nang buong katapatan at sigasig ang aking mga tungkulin bilang Pangulo [o Pangalawang Pangulo o Nanunungkulang Pangulo] ng Pilipinas, pangangalagaan at ipagtatanggol ang kanyang Konstitusyon, ipatutupad ang mga batas nito, magiging makatarungan sa bawat tao, at itatalaga ang aking sarili sa paglilingkod sa Bansa. Kasihan nawa ako ng Diyos. [Kapag pagpapatotoo, ang huling pangungusap ay kakaltasin.]

=== Inaugural address ===
Every president since Emilio Aguinaldo delivered an inaugural address. Presidents, who became president upon the death of their predecessor, also delivered an address. It is usually delivered after the new president took the oath of office. However, President Gloria Macapagal Arroyo delivered the inaugural address first at the Quirino Grandstand and then took the oath of office in Cebu.

== Gallery ==
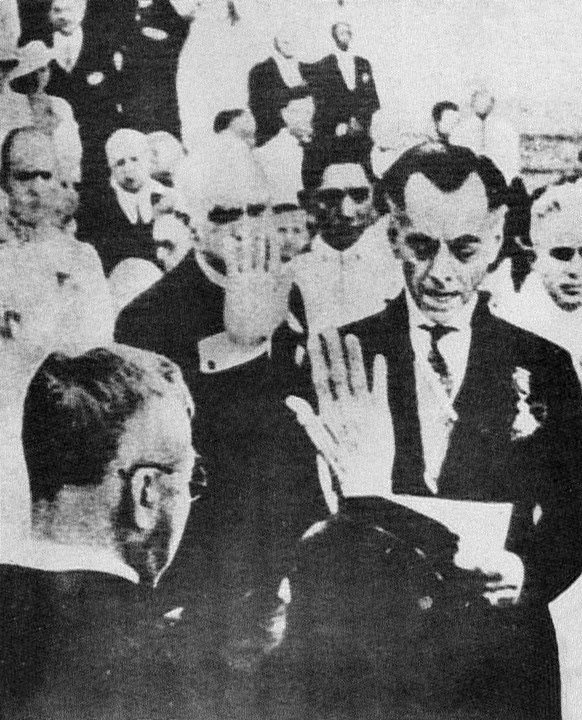
Inauguration of President Manuel L. Quezon, 1935.

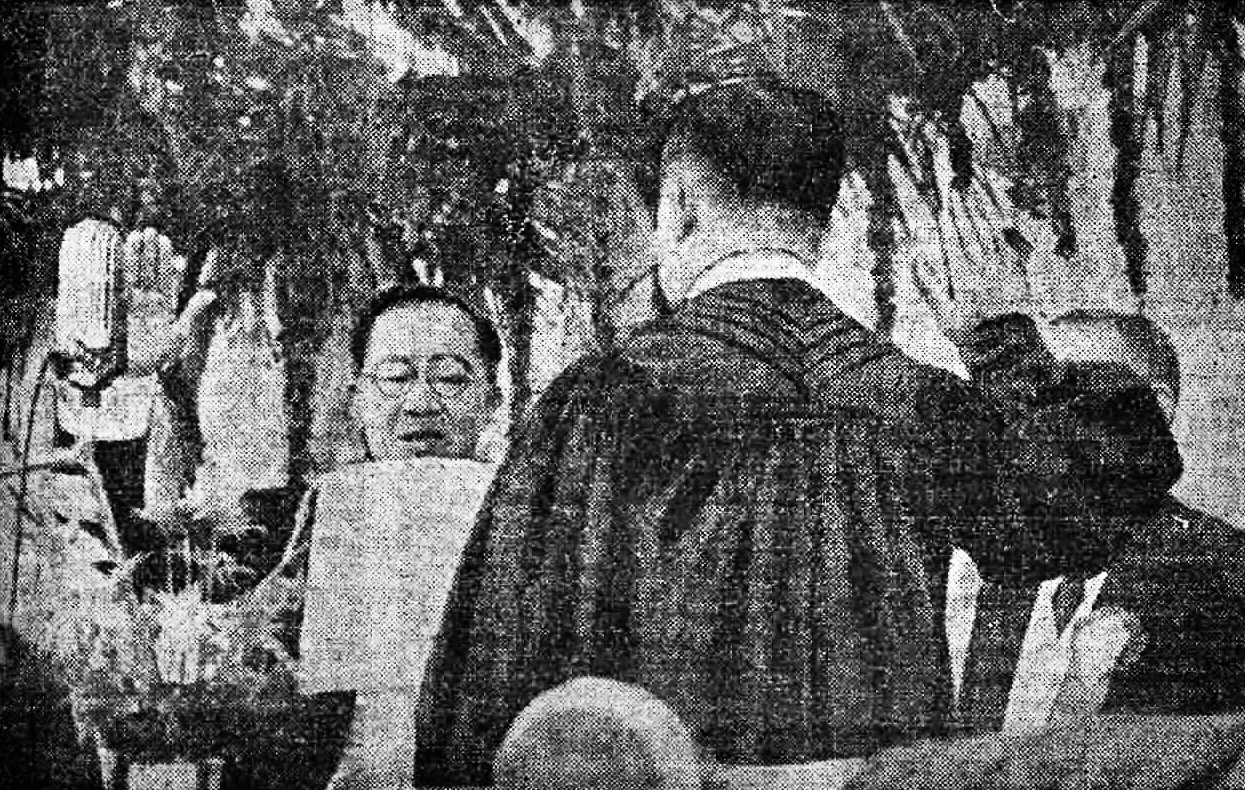
Inauguration of President Jose P. Laurel, 1943.

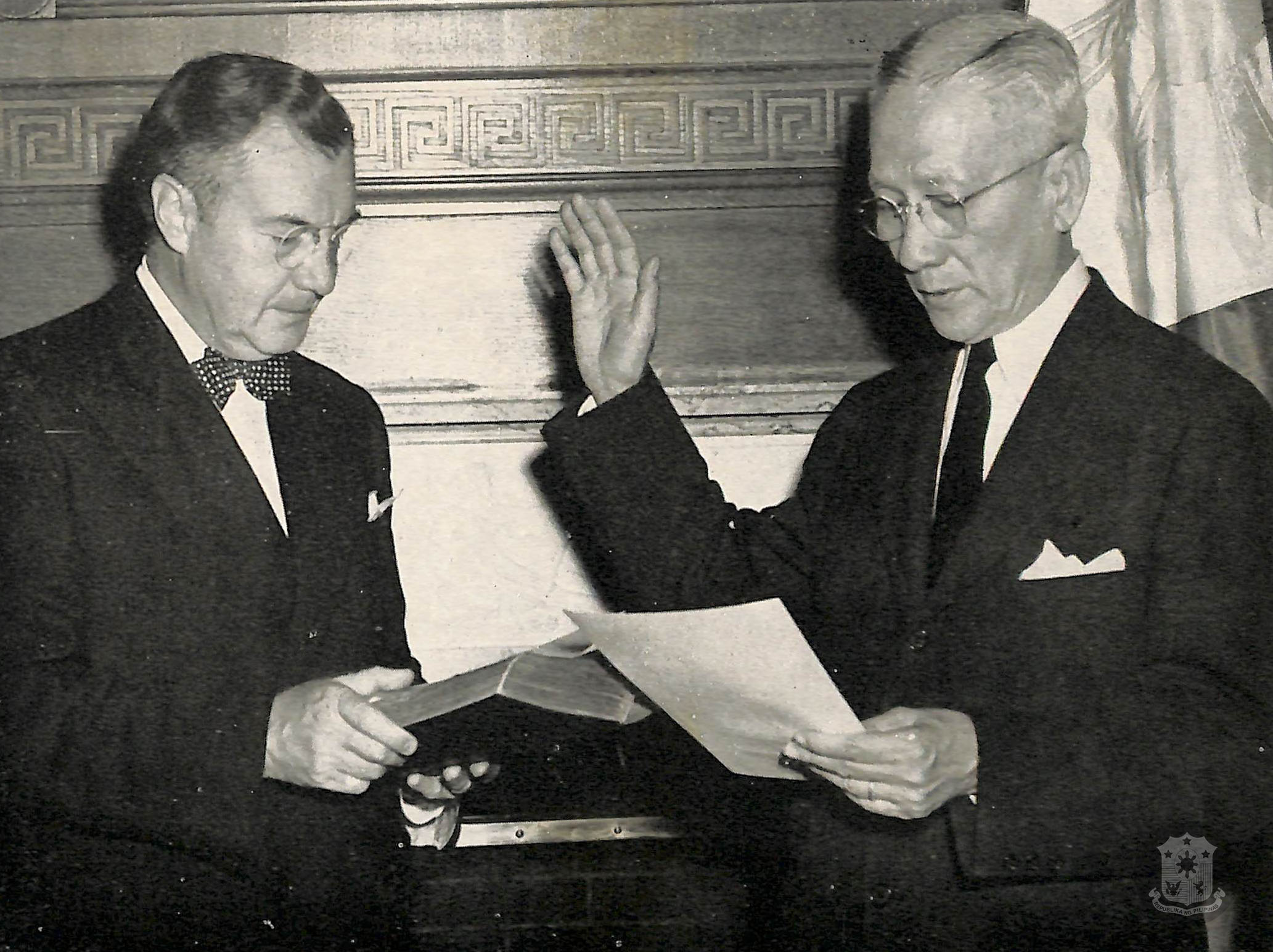
Inauguration of President Sergio Osmeña, 1944.

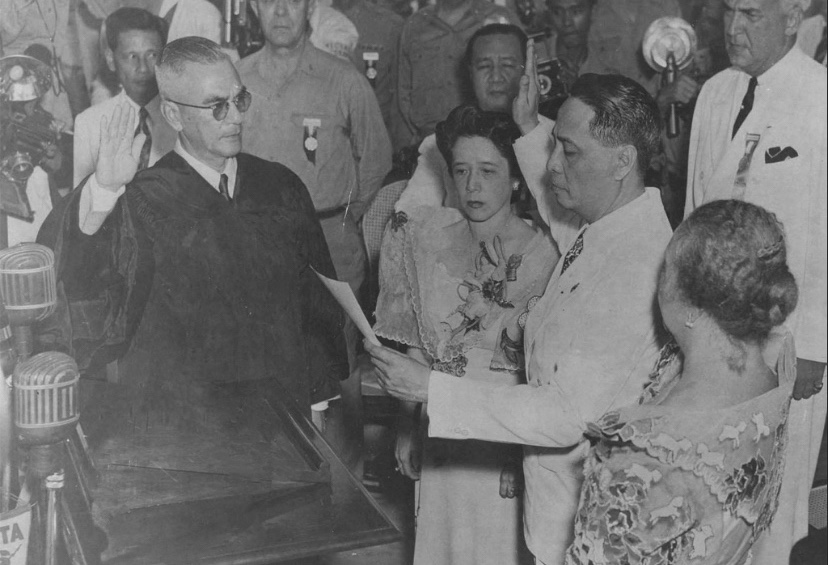
First inauguration of President Manuel Roxas, 1946.

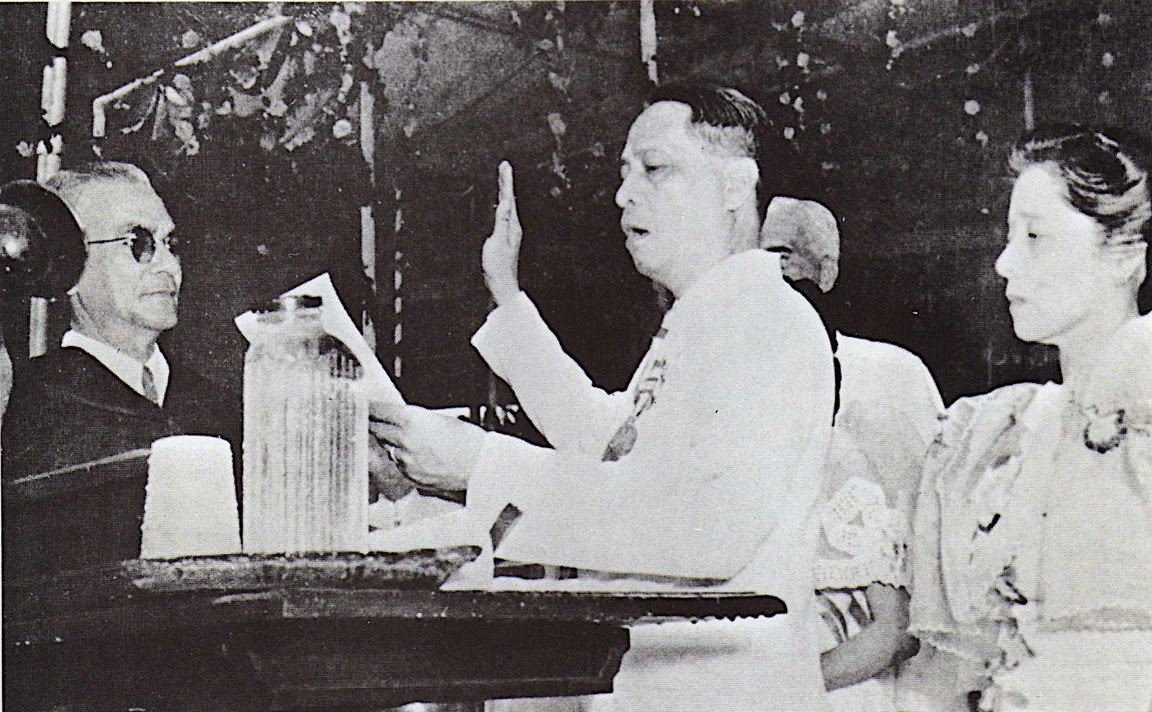
Second Inauguration of President Manuel Roxas, 1946.

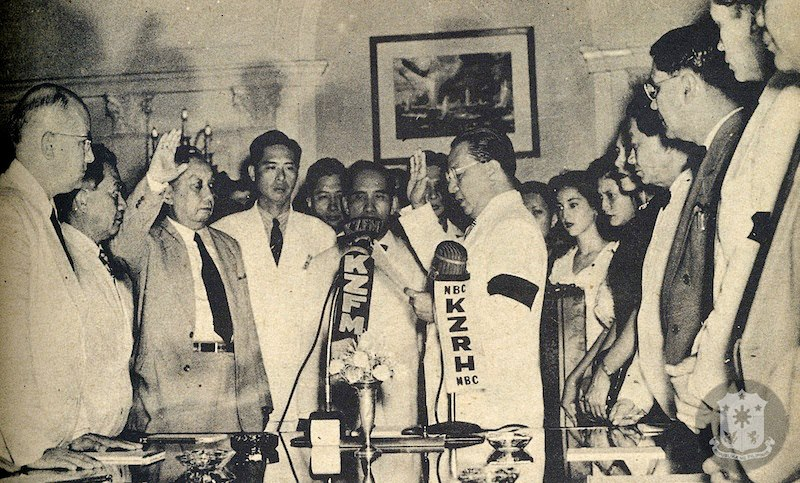
First Inauguration of President Elpidio Quirino, 1948.

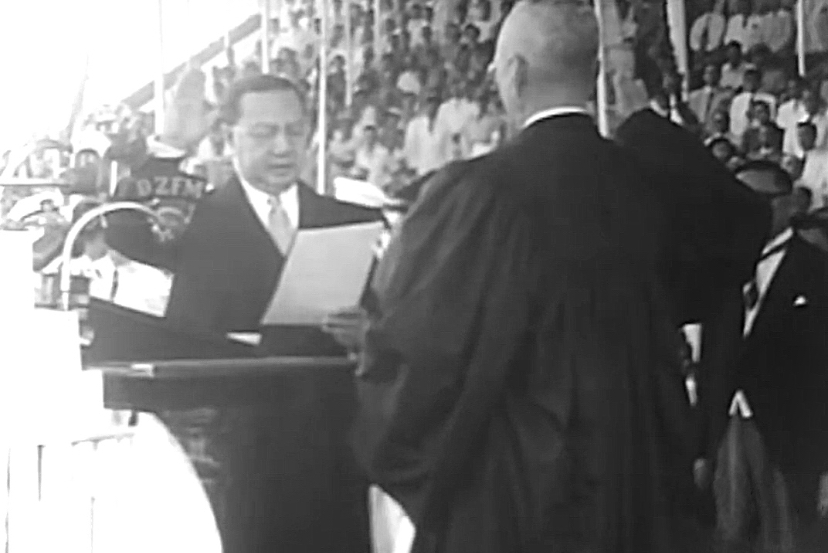
Second Inauguration of President Elpidio Quirino, 1949.

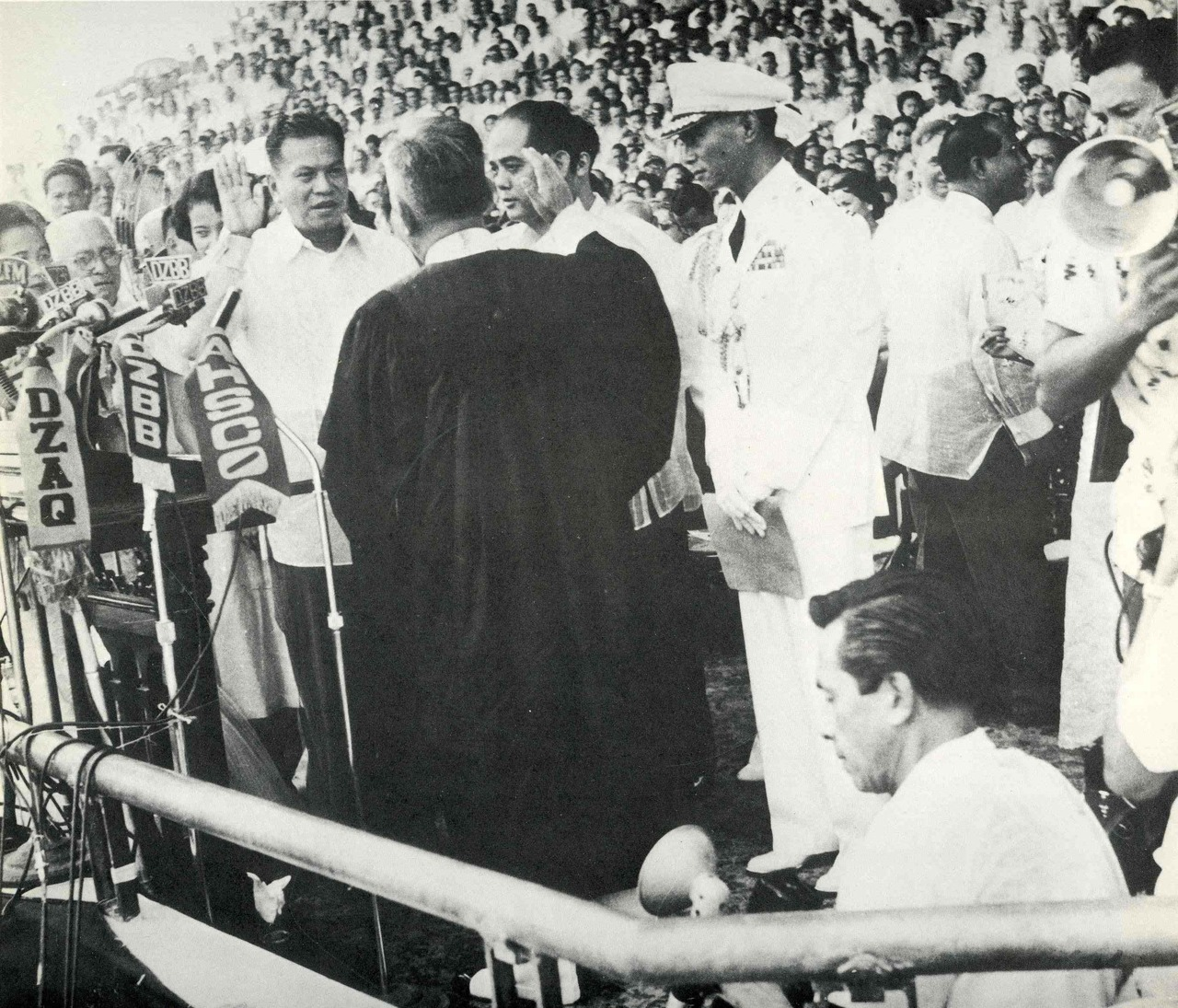
Inauguration of President Ramon Magsaysay, 1953.

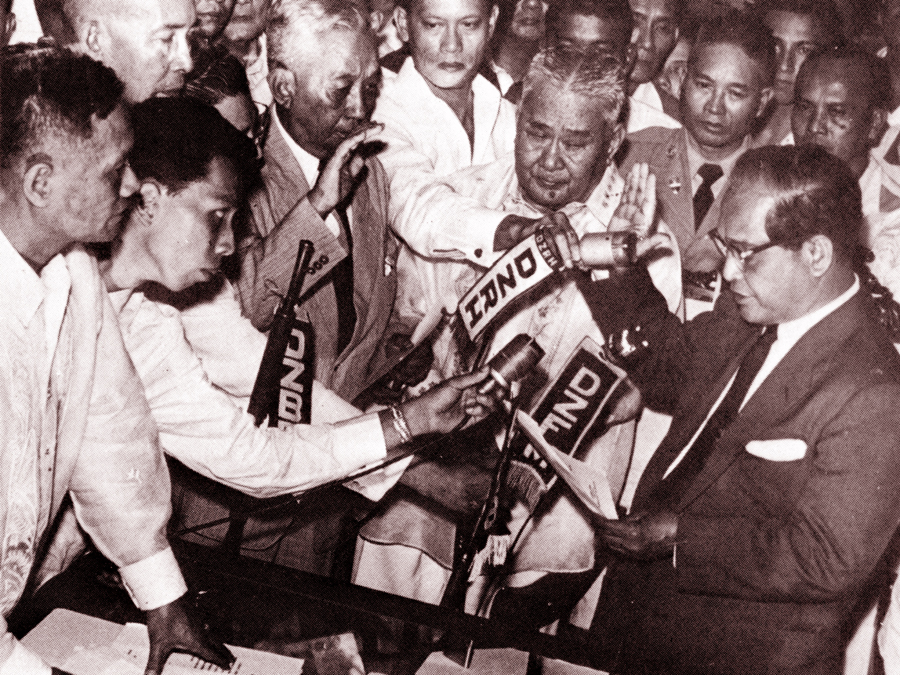
First Inauguration of President Carlos P. García, 1957.

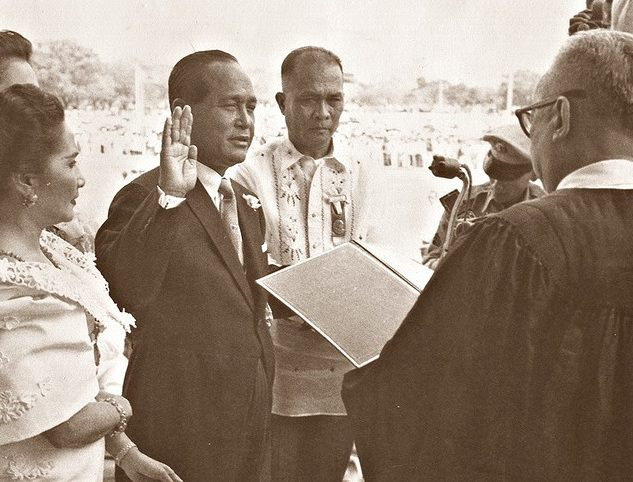
Second Inauguration of President Carlos P. García, 1957.

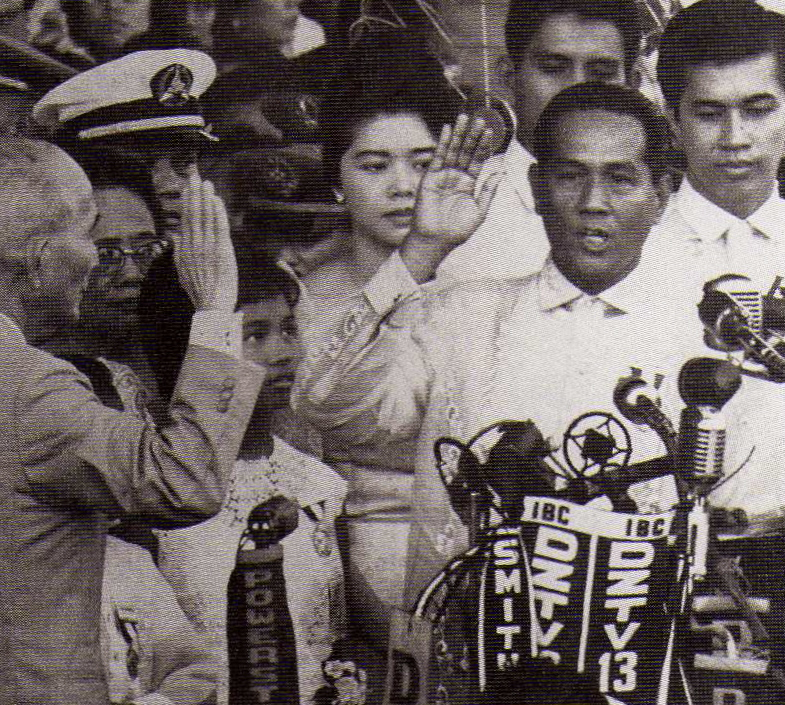
Inauguration of President Diosdado Macapagal, 1961.

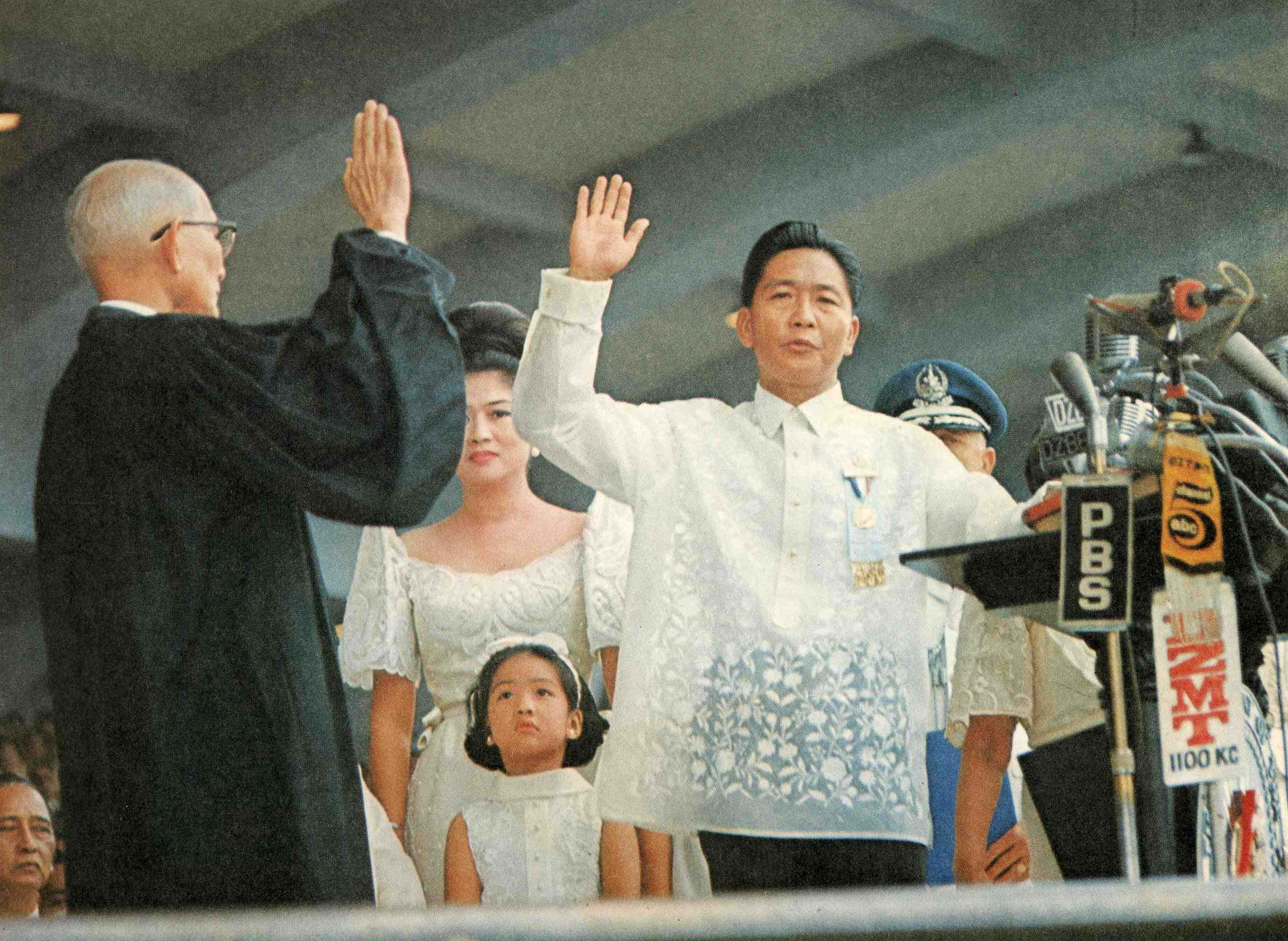
First Inauguration of President Ferdinand E. Marcos, 1965.

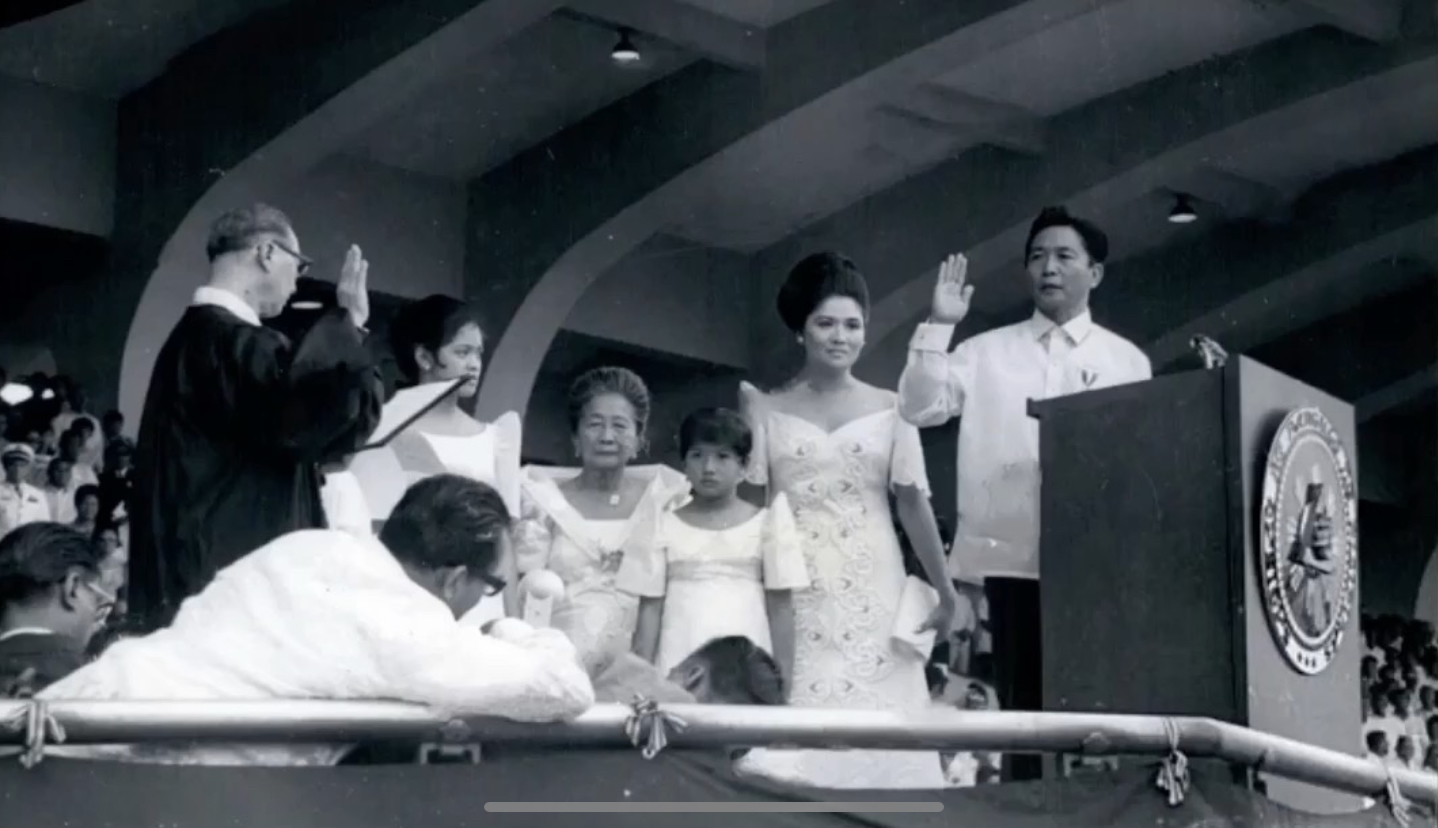
Second inauguration of President Ferdinand Marcos, 1969.

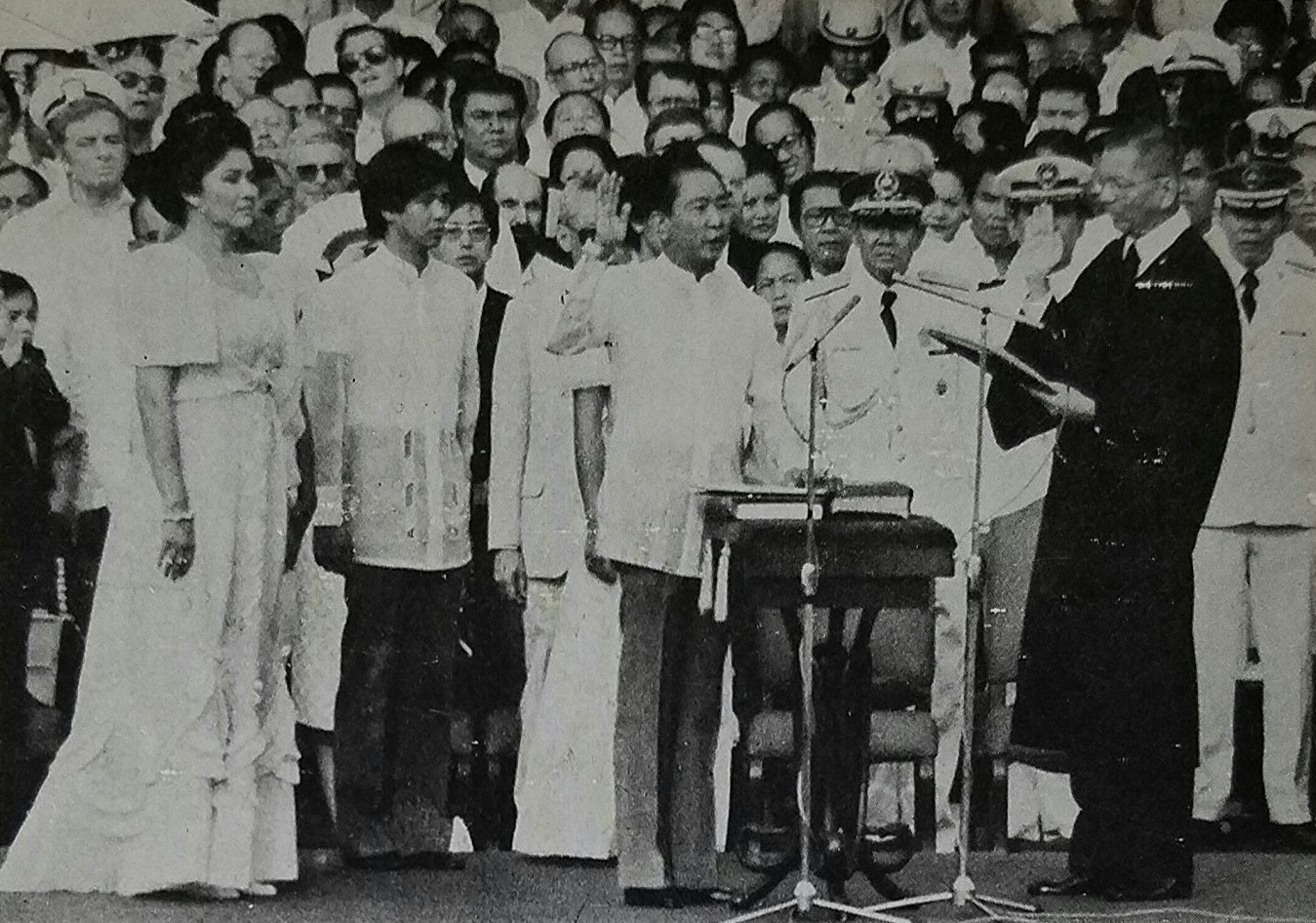
Third inauguration of President Ferdinand Marcos, 1981.

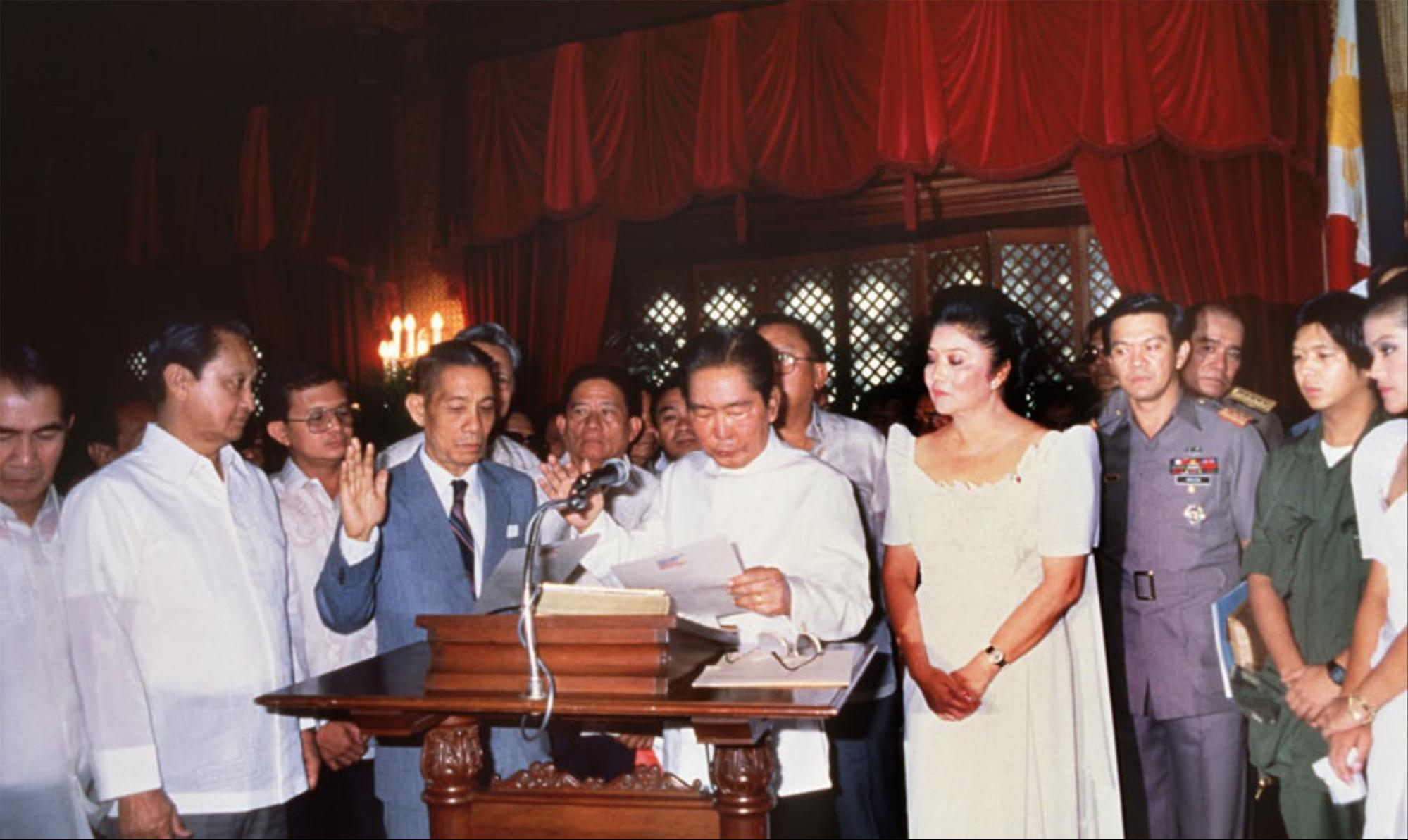
Fourth inauguration of President Ferdinand Marcos, 1986.

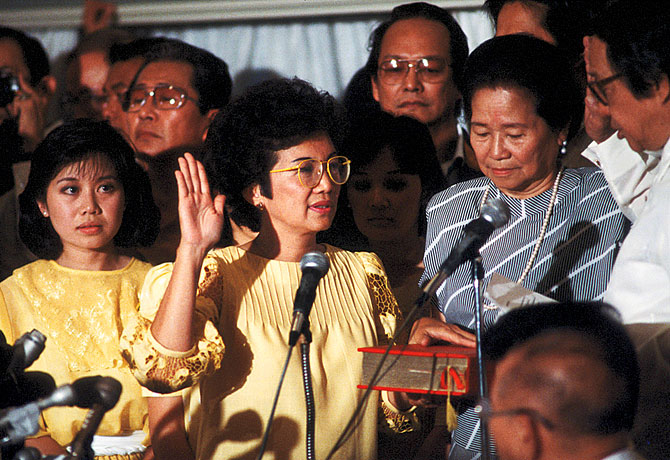
Inauguration of President Corazon Aquino, 1986.

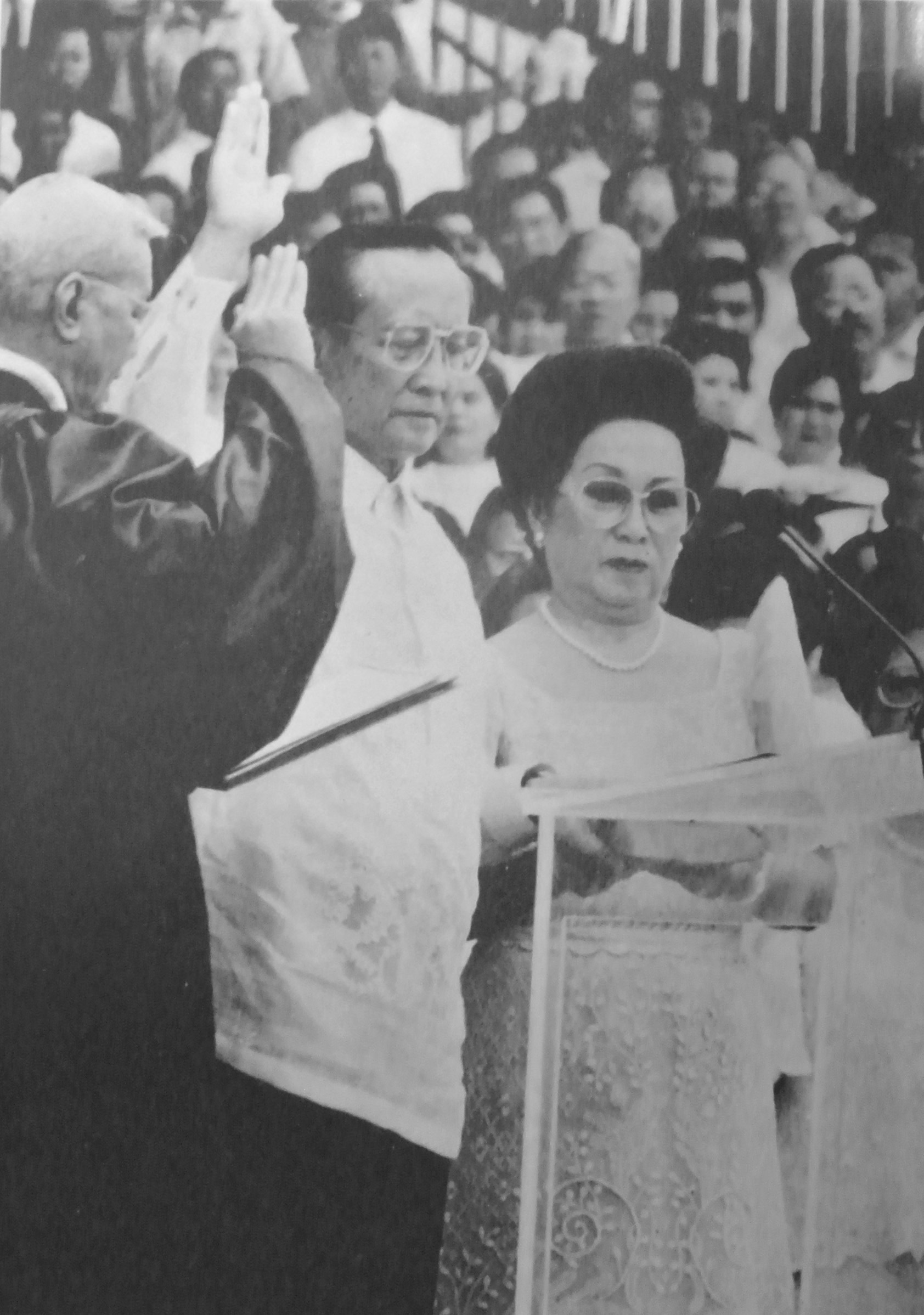
Inauguration of President Fidel V. Ramos, 1992.

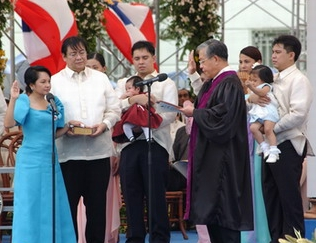
Second Inauguration of President Gloria Macapagal Arroyo, 2004.

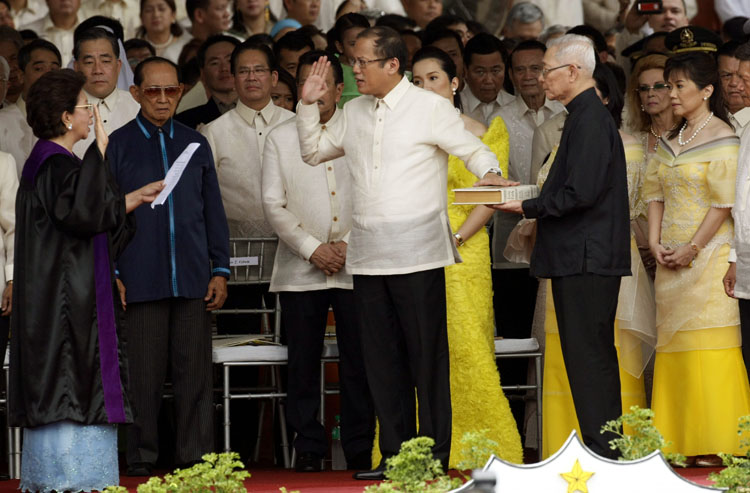
Inauguration of President Benigno Aquino III, 2010.

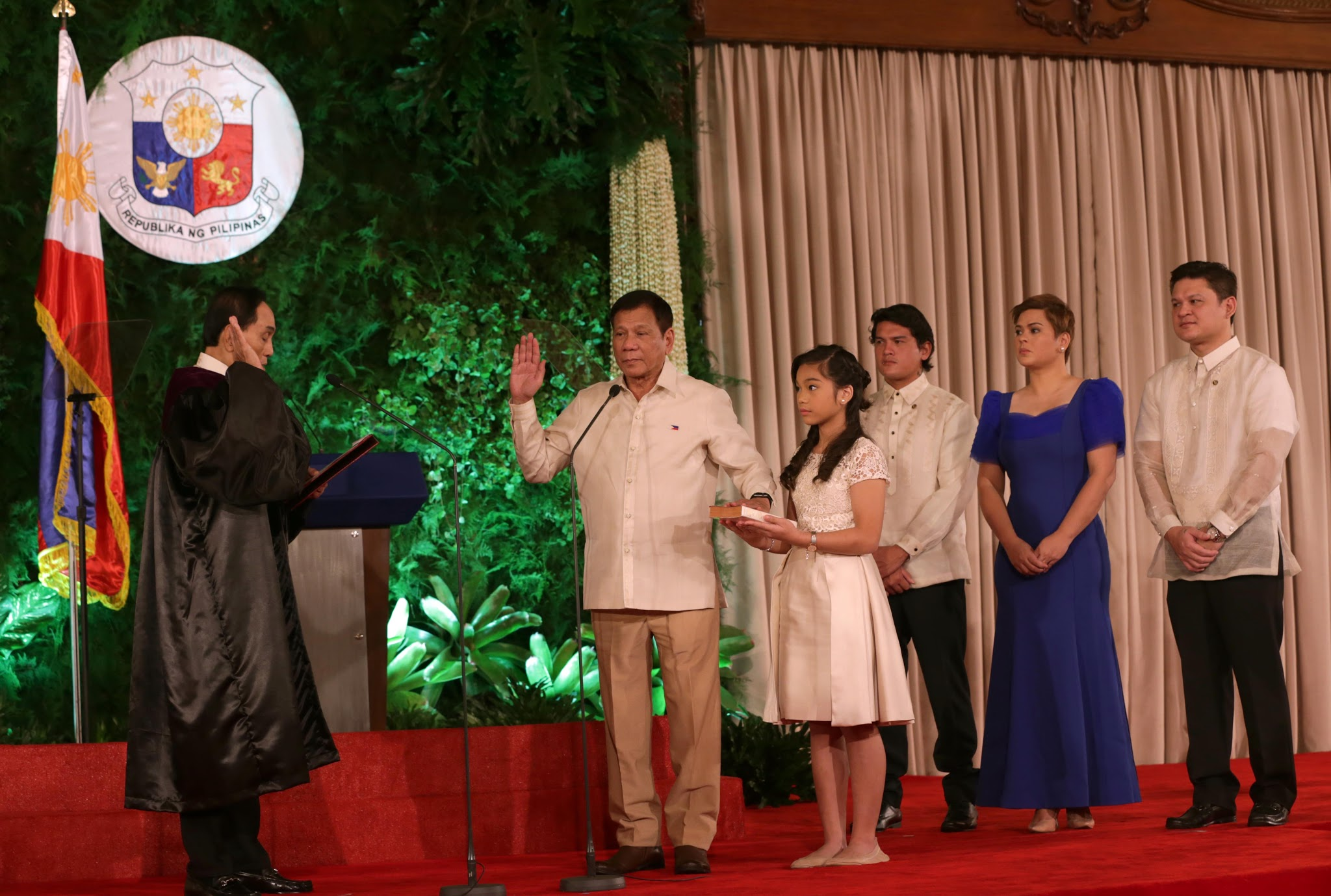
Inauguration of President Rodrigo Duterte, 2016.

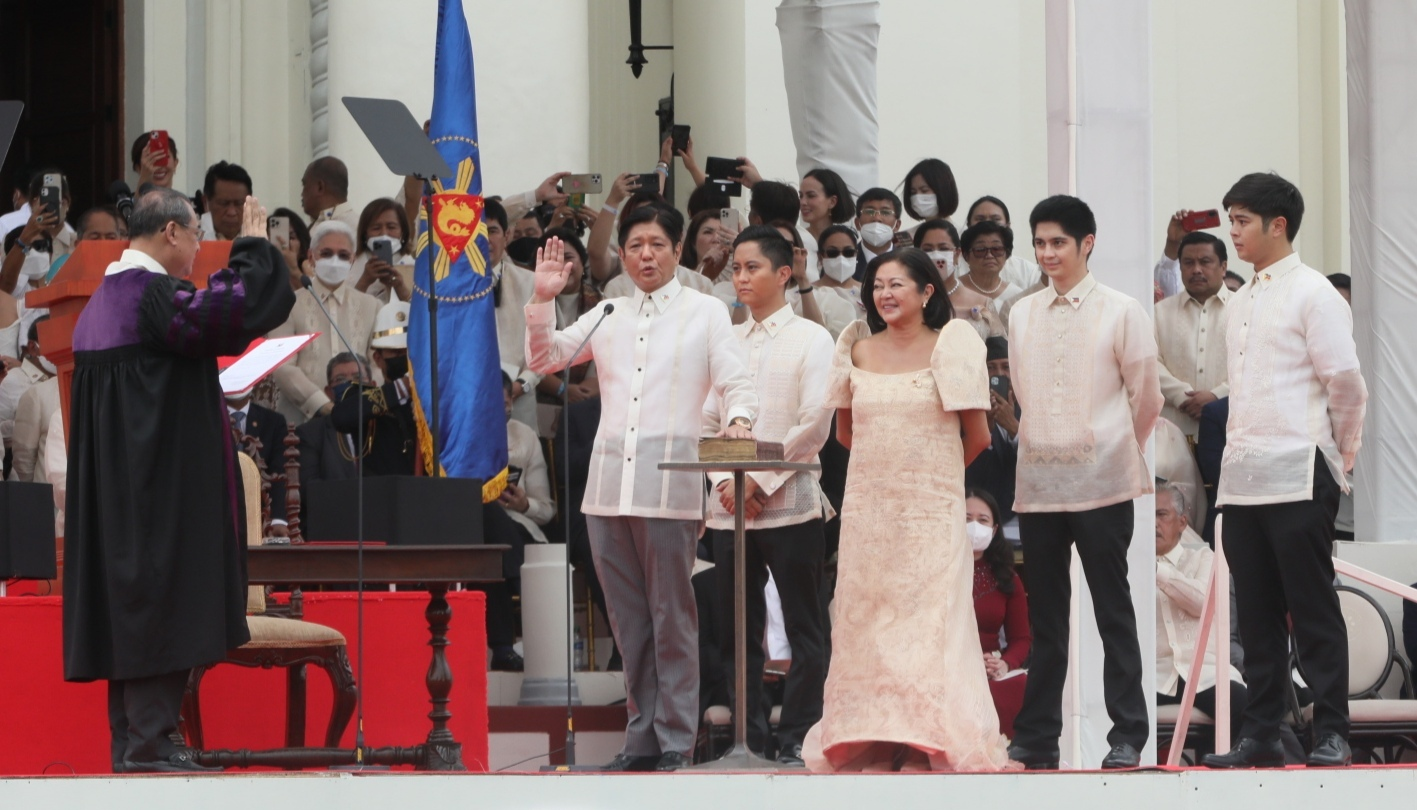
Inauguration of President Bongbong Marcos, 2022.

== List of inaugural ceremonies ==
Note: Vice presidents-elect usually take the oath of office with the president-elect, but Rodrigo Duterte broke tradition by requesting then Vice President-elect Leni Robredo to hold inauguration rites separately. The only other instance that the vice president was inaugurated separately was when Gloria Macapagal Arroyo succeeded to the presidency and nominated Teofisto Guingona as vice president. Guingona was confirmed by Congress on February 9, 2001, and took the oath of office the same day.

Date	President	Event	Location	Oath administered by (Note: Individual named is the chief justice, unless otherwise indicated)	Document sworn on	Address	Notes
March 22, 1897	Emilio Aguinaldo	First inauguration of Emilio Aguinaldo	Holy Cross Parish Church, Santa Cruz de Malabon, Cavite	Fr. Cenon Villafranca	none	none	
January 23, 1899	Emilio Aguinaldo	Second inauguration of Emilio Aguinaldo	Barasoain Church, Malolos, Bulacan	President of the Assembly of Representatives Pedro Paterno	none	Emilio Aguinaldo's Inaugural Address	
November 15, 1935	Manuel L. Quezon	First inauguration of Manuel L. Quezon	Legislative Building, Manila	Ramon Avanceña	none	none	
December 30, 1941	Manuel L. Quezon	Second inauguration of Manuel L. Quezon	Malinta Tunnel, Corregidor, Cavite City	José Abad Santos	none	none	
November 15, 1943	Manuel L. Quezon	Third inauguration of Manuel L. Quezon	Washington, D.C., United States	US Assoc. Justice Felix Frankfurter	none	none	
August 1, 1944	Sergio Osmeña	Inauguration of Sergio Osmeña (Extraordinary inauguration)	Washington, D.C., United States	US Assoc. Justice Robert H. Jackson	none	Sergio Osmeña's Inaugural Address	
October 14, 1943	Jose P. Laurel	Inauguration of José P. Laurel	Legislative Building, Manila	José Yulo	none	Jose P. Laurel's Inaugural Address	
May 28, 1946 (Note: The Commonwealth oath of office included a pledge of allegiance to the sovereignty of the United States)	Manuel Roxas	First inauguration of Manuel Roxas	Legislative Building, Manila	Manuel Moran	none	Jose P. Laurel's Inaugural Address	
July 4, 1946 (Note: When the independence of the Philippines was recognized on July 4, 1946, Roxas retook his oath of office again, without the pledge of allegiance, as befits the president of a sovereign nation)	Manuel Roxas	Second inauguration of Manuel Roxas	Independence Grandstand, Manila	Manuel Moran	none	none	
April 17, 1948 (Note: Upon the death of Manuel Roxas)	Elpidio Quirino	First inauguration of Elpidio Quirino (Extraordinary inauguration)	Council of State Room, Executive Building, Malacañang Palace	Assoc. Justice Ricardo Paras	none	Elpidio Quirino's Inaugural Remarks	Second of three vice presidents to assume the presidency upon the death of the president
December 30, 1949 (Note: Upon his election in 1949)	Elpidio Quirino	Second inauguration of Elpidio Quirino	Independence Grandstand, Manila	Manuel Moran	none	Elpidio Quirino's Inaugural Address	
December 30, 1953	Ramon Magsaysay	Inauguration of Ramon Magsaysay	Independence Grandstand, Manila	Ricardo Paras	Two family bibles; one each from his mother and father's side	Ramon Magsaysay's Inaugural Address	
March 18, 1957 (Note: Upon the death of Ramon Magsaysay)	Carlos P. Garcia	First inauguration of Carlos P. Garcia (Extraordinary inauguration)	Council of State Room, Executive Building, Malacañang Palace	Ricardo Paras	none	Carlos P. Garcia's Inaugural Remarks	Third of three vice presidents to assume the presidency upon the death of the president
December 30, 1957 (Note: Upon his election in 1957)	Carlos P. Garcia	Second inauguration of Carlos P. Garcia	Independence Grandstand, Manila	Ricardo Paras	Closed family bible	Carlos P. Garcia's Inaugural Address	
December 30, 1961	Diosdado Macapagal	Inauguration of Diosdado Macapagal	Quirino Grandstand, Manila	César Bengzon	Closed family bible	Diosdado Macapagal's Inaugural Address	
December 30, 1965	Ferdinand Marcos	First inauguration of Ferdinand Marcos	Quirino Grandstand, Manila	César Bengzon	Two closed family bibles; one owned by his father Mariano and one owned by his wife Imelda.	Ferdinand Marcos' First Inaugural Address	
December 30, 1969	Ferdinand Marcos	Second inauguration of Ferdinand Marcos	Quirino Grandstand, Manila	Roberto Concepcion	none	Ferdinand Marcos' Second Inaugural Address	
June 12, 1978 (Note: Confirmed as Prime Minister)	Ferdinand Marcos	Prime Ministerial confirmation of Ferdinand Marcos	Batasang Pambansa Complex, Quezon City	Fred Ruiz Castro	none	none	
June 30, 1981	Ferdinand Marcos	Third inauguration of Ferdinand Marcos	Quirino Grandstand, Manila	Enrique Fernando	Two closed family bibles	Ferdinand Marcos' Third Inaugural Address	
February 25, 1986 (Note: Upon certification of COMELEC)	Ferdinand Marcos	Fourth inauguration of Ferdinand Marcos (Extraordinary inauguration)	Maharlika Hall, Malacañang Palace	Ramon Aquino	none	none	
February 25, 1986 (Note: Upon certification of NAMFREL)	Corazon Aquino	Inauguration of Corazon Aquino (Extraordinary inauguration)	Club Filipino, Greenhills, San Juan, Metro Manila	Assoc. Justice Claudio Teehankee, Sr.	Closed family bible; owned by Aurora Aquino, mother of Ninoy Aquino	Corazon Aquino's Inaugural Address	
February 11, 1987	Corazon Aquino	Second Inauguration of Corazon Aquino (Extraordinary inauguration)	Rizal Hall, Malacañang Palace, Manila	Chief Justice Claudio Teehankee, Sr.	Closed family bible held by her eldest daughter Ballsy Aquino-Cruz.		President Aquino took the oath of office for a second time following the ratification of the 1987 Philippine Constitution. Vice President Salvador Laurel also took the oath of office.
June 30, 1992	Fidel V. Ramos	Inauguration of Fidel V. Ramos	Quirino Grandstand, Manila	Andres Narvasa	Closed family bible	Fidel Ramos' Inaugural Address	
June 30, 1998	Joseph Ejercito Estrada	Inauguration of Joseph Estrada	Barasoain Church, Malolos, Bulacan	Andres Narvasa	Closed family bible	Joseph Estrada's Inaugural Address	
January 20, 2001 (Note: Upon the culmination of EDSA II)	Gloria Macapagal Arroyo	First inauguration of Gloria Macapagal Arroyo (Extraordinary inauguration)	EDSA Shrine, Quezon City	Hilario Davide, Jr.	Closed family bible	Gloria Macapagal Arroyo's First Inaugural Address	
June 30, 2004 (Note: Upon her election in 2004)	Gloria Macapagal Arroyo	Second inauguration of Gloria Macapagal Arroyo	Cebu Provincial Capitol, Cebu City	Hilario Davide, Jr.	Closed family bible; same one used by Diosdado Macapagal in 1961	Gloria Macapagal Arroyo's Second Inaugural Address	
June 30, 2010	Benigno S. Aquino III	Inauguration of Benigno Aquino III	Quirino Grandstand, Manila	Assoc. Justice Conchita Carpio-Morales	Closed family bible; same one used by Corazon Aquino in 1986	Benigno Aquino III's Inaugural Address	
June 30, 2016	Rodrigo Roa Duterte	Inauguration of Rodrigo Duterte	Rizal Hall, Malacañang Palace, Manila	Assoc. Justice Bienvenido L. Reyes	Family bible; owned by Rodrigo's mother, Soledad	Rodrigo Duterte's Inaugural Address	Vice President Leni Robredo held a separate inauguration at Quezon City Reception House
June 30, 2022	Bongbong Marcos	Inauguration of Bongbong Marcos	National Museum of Fine Arts, Manila	Alexander Gesmundo	Closed family bible used by his father Ferdinand Marcos during 1965 Presidential Inauguration	Bongbong Marcos' Inaugural Address	Vice President Sara Duterte held a separate inauguration at San Pedro Square in Davao City on June 19, 2022
