= Marcos administration =

The Marcos administration, Marcos Administration, Marcos presidency, Marcos Presidency or Marcos leadership may refer to the following:

- Presidency of Ferdinand Marcos Sr., (1965–1986)
  - First term of the presidency of Ferdinand Marcos, (1965–1969)
  - Second term of the presidency of Ferdinand Marcos, (1969–1972)
  - Martial law under Ferdinand Marcos, (1972–1986)
- Presidency of Bongbong Marcos Jr., (2022–2028)

== See also ==
- People Power Revolution
- Ferdinand Marcos's cult of personality
- Marcos family
