= Inauguration of Rodrigo Duterte =

2016 Philippine presidential inauguration

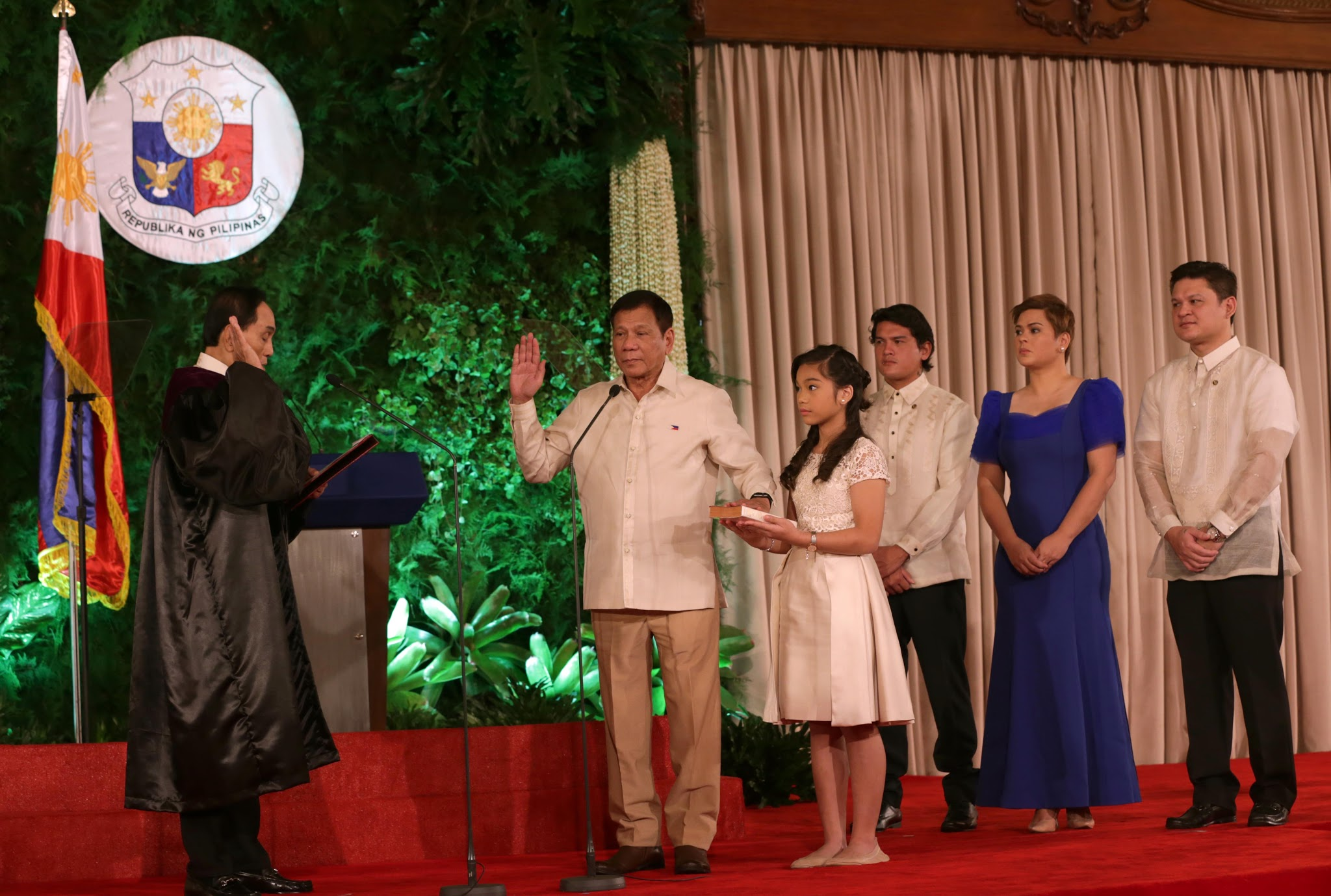
- Rodrigo Duterte takes his oath of office as the 16th president of the Philippines.
- Date: June 30, 2016; 9 years ago
- Location: Duterte: Rizal Ceremonial Hall, Malacañang Palace Manila Robredo: Quezon City Reception House Quezon City
- Participants: President of the Philippines, Rodrigo Duterte Assuming office Associate Justice of the Supreme Court of the Philippines, Bienvenido L. Reyes Administering oath Vice President of the Philippines; Maria Leonor Robredo Assuming office Brgy. Punta Tarawal, Calabanga, Camarines Sur Captain, Ronaldo D. Coner; Brgy. Mariana, Quezon City Captain, Regina San Miguel Administering oath Transition Team of Rodrigo Duterte and Presidential Transition Committee

The inauguration of Rodrigo Duterte as the 16th president of the Philippines took place at around noon (PHT) on Thursday, June 30, 2016 at the Rizal Ceremonial Hall of the Malacañang Palace in Manila. The oath of office was administered by the Associate Justice of the Supreme Court Bienvenido Reyes. Veronica Duterte, Duterte's daughter with Honeylet Avanceña, held the Bible of the president's late mother Soledad. Veronica was joined by her three step-siblings, namely Sara, Paolo and Sebastian.

It was the fourth Philippine presidential inauguration that was held in Malacañang, the second scheduled since the fourth inauguration of Ferdinand Marcos, held in the midst of the 1986 People Power Revolution.

As requested by Duterte due to a variety of reasons, Leni Robredo, who was elected as the fourteenth vice president, held a separate inauguration at the Quezon City Reception House.

The inauguration was organized jointly by the Presidential Transition Cooperation Team of outgoing President Benigno Aquino III and the Transition Team of incoming President Rodrigo Duterte.

== Duterte's inaugural ceremony ==
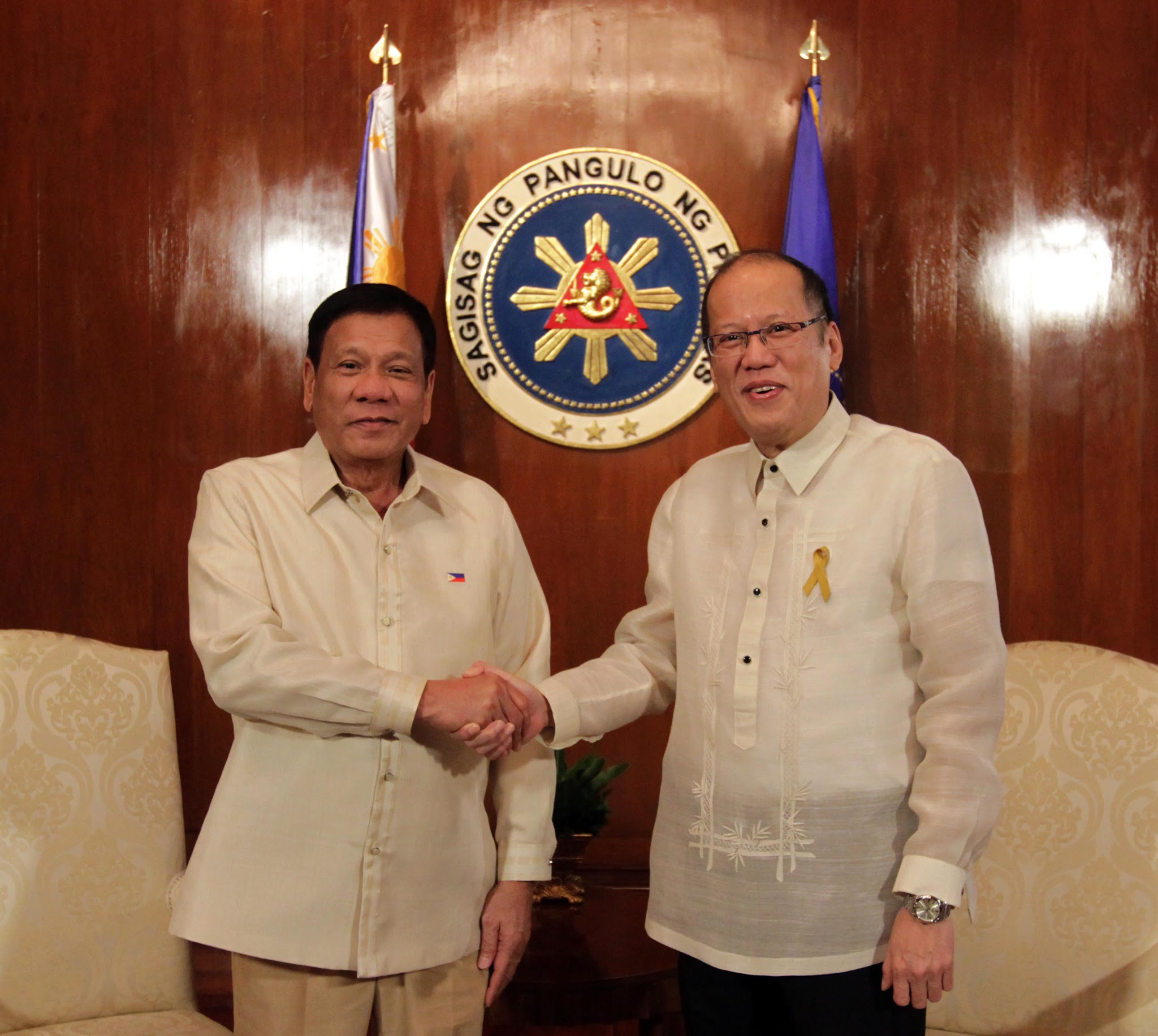
Duterte (left) and Aquino (right)

The rites started with a departure honors for outgoing president Benigno Aquino III in the Malacañang Palace grounds, a 21-gun salute was given to Aquino by the Armed Forces of the Philippines (AFP) in honor for the former commander-in-chief. Aquino left the Malacañang at 11 a.m., to spend his first day returning as a civilian at the Aquino family's residence on Times Street, Quezon City.

After the arrival of Duterte in the Rizal Hall, Lupang Hinirang, the Philippine National Anthem was sung, followed by an interfaith prayer, and a musical performance by Freddie Aguilar who sang "Para sa Tunay na Pagbabago", the official campaign song of Duterte to the tune of one of Aguilar's songs, Ipaglalaban Ko. Senate President Franklin Drilon read the joint resolution by both Houses to congratulate Duterte and Robredo for their victory in the 2016 elections. At exactly 12:00 noon PHT, Duterte took oath as president by Associate Justice Reyes administered the oath of office.

The inaugural speech was delivered mostly in English with a little mix of Filipino and Cebuano. He vowed for the next six years to restore the people's trust and confidence in the government. He also said that the campaign against drugs and criminality would be relentless and sustained within the bounds of the law. Duterte also promised to secure peace agreements with the Moro separatists and the New People's Army, in accordance with the constitutional and legal reforms. He also vowed to eliminate red tape in government agencies by instructing his incoming cabinet members and agency heads to reduce requirements and processing time of applications. He also directed them to avoid changing the rules on any government contracts and transactions.

He also offered his deepest condolences to the people of Turkey, following the 2016 Istanbul Atatürk Airport attack.

After the speech, President Duterte led the mass oath-taking ceremony of his appointed cabinet members. This was followed by the first full military honors for Duterte. After which, a diplomatic reception was held for foreign dignitaries in attendance before the first meeting of Duterte and his cabinet.

According to Presidential Communications Secretary Martin Andanar, more than 627 guests were invited for the event held at the Rizal Ceremonial Hall of the Malacañang Palace. President Duterte did away with the traditional vin d'honneur for visiting foreign dignitaries, and instead, the inaugural rites were followed by a "diplomatic reception". President Duterte used a teleprompter for his speech in mixed English, Filipino and Cebuano.

Among the dishes and drinks served during the inaugural luncheon were monggo soup, durian tartlet, pandesal with white cheese, lumpia ubod punch, dalandan juice and pine-mango cooler.

The inauguration was aired for the first time on Facebook Live, with the livestream catering to those who had no access to radio and television, as well as the Overseas Filipino Workers (OFWs).

Hours after the cabinet meeting, President Duterte attended a solidarity dinner together with the urban poor community at the Delpan Sports Complex in San Nicolas, Manila.

== Robredo's inaugural ceremony ==
Vice President Leni Robredo took her oath of office at 9:00 a.m. PHT at the Quezon City Reception House, Robredo's official office. By her request, Robredo's oath was administered by two village chiefs, Ronaldo D. Coner, the chief of Barangay Punta Tarawal in Calabanga, Camarines Sur, described as the "smallest, farthest and poorest barangay" in Robredo's home province, Camarines Sur, and Regina Celeste San Miguel, the chief of Barangay Mariana, Quezon City where Robredo's office is located. Jillian, the youngest daughter of the Vice President, holds the bible for Robredo. She was joined by two older sisters, Aika and Tricia.

In her delivered speech after the oathtaking, Robredo called to the people to work together to unite in times of conflict and divisions. She also open to any partnerships and collaborations with the government, private sector and non-government organizations to further served her duties as vice president for the people in the "Laylayan ng Lipunan" (fringes of society). Robredo iterated that in her first 100 days of vice president, she would visit the smallest and farthest barangays in the city, just as she did during her term as Congresswoman of the 3rd District of Camarines Sur. Among the platforms that Robredo said she would be prioritizing during her term were solving poverty, rural development, people empowerment, food security and universal health care.

More than 300 guests were invited in this occasion, including representatives from different sectors, supporters and volunteer groups who helped in Robredo's vice presidential campaign. Mar Roxas, Robredo's running mate, and Kris Aquino, sister of outgoing president Benigno Aquino III were among those who attended.

Afterwards, a post-inaugural thanksgiving concert for Robredo was held at the Quezon Memorial Circle in the afternoon. Musicians and artists who actively supported Robredo in the 2016 elections performed in the concert.

== Gallery ==
Oath taking and Inaugural address
