= Inauguration of Gloria Macapagal Arroyo =

Inauguration of Gloria Macapagal Arroyo may refer to:

- First inauguration of Gloria Macapagal Arroyo, 2001
- Second inauguration of Gloria Macapagal Arroyo, 2004
