= Inauguration of Carlos P. Garcia =

Inauguration of Carlos P. Garcia may refer to:

- First inauguration of Carlos P. Garcia, March 1957
- Second inauguration of Carlos P. Garcia, December 1957
