= Second inauguration of Gloria Macapagal Arroyo =

2004 Philippine presidential inauguration

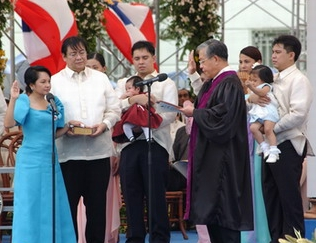
- Inauguration of Gloria Macapagal Arroyo in Cebu City
- Date: June 30, 2004; 21 years ago
- Location: Cebu Provincial Capitol Cebu City
- Participants: President of the Philippines, Gloria Macapagal Arroyo Assuming office Chief Justice of the Supreme Court of the Philippines, Hilario Davide, Jr. Administering oath Vice President of the Philippines; Manuel "Noli" L. de Castro Assuming office Chief Justice of the Supreme Court of the Philippines, Hilario Davide, Jr. Administering oath Transition Team of Gloria Macapagal-Arroyo and Presidential Transition Coordination Team

The second inauguration of Gloria Macapagal Arroyo as the 14th president of the Philippines took place on Wednesday, June 30, 2004 at the Cebu Provincial Capitol in Cebu City. The inauguration marked the commencement of the second term (and full six-year term) of Gloria Macapagal Arroyo as president and the only six-year term of Noli de Castro as Vice President. The oath of office was administered by Chief Justice of the Supreme Court of the Philippines Hilario Davide, Jr. Before that, Arroyo delivered her inaugural speech at the Quirino Grandstand in Manila.

== Context ==
The inauguration formally ended the Presidential transition of Gloria Macapagal Arroyo that began when Arroyo won the 2004 Philippine presidential election. Arroyo took her first oath of office at EDSA Shrine following the Second People Power Revolution as mandated by the Constitution when Joseph Estrada stepped down. Her succession to the presidency is to finish the unexpired term of Estrada. Her inauguration took place in Cebu, marking it the first inauguration to be held outside Luzon. Cebu became the place of inaugural as a gesture of gratitude to the people of the Province of Cebu where she garnered the highest number of votes in the 2004 Presidential elections.

== Inaugural events ==
=== Pre-inaugural speech ===
At around 7:45 AM (PHT or 2345 UTC), President Gloria Macapagal Arroyo arrived at the Quirino Grandstand and it started with the singing of the Philippine National Anthem by Sarah Geronimo followed by an ecumenical prayer. Then Executive Secretary Alberto Romulo introduced Arroyo, who delivered her speech that lasted for 20 minutes. After that, the inaugural theme, "Pilipinas, Tayo Na" was interpreted by Mark Bautista and Jolina Magdangal.

=== Oath of office ===
Before noon, Arroyo arrived at the Cebu Provincial Capitol and started with the singing of the Philippine National Anthem by Nora Aunor followed by an ecumenical prayer. After which, Vice President-elect Noli de Castro was sworn in a few minutes prior to Arroyo to secure the constitutional line of succession. At exactly 12:00 noon, Chief Justice Davide administered the oath of office to Arroyo.

== Post-inaugural events ==
The president proceeded to the Shangri-La Mactan Hotel for a vin d'honneur. She then proceeded to the Cebu Metropolitan Cathedral for a mass celebrated by Cardinal-Archbishop Ricardo Vidal.

== Gallery ==
Pre-inaugural address at Luneta Grandstand

Oath of Office in Cebu Provincial Capitol, Cebu City
