= Inauguration of Fidel V. Ramos =

1992 Philippine presidential inauguration

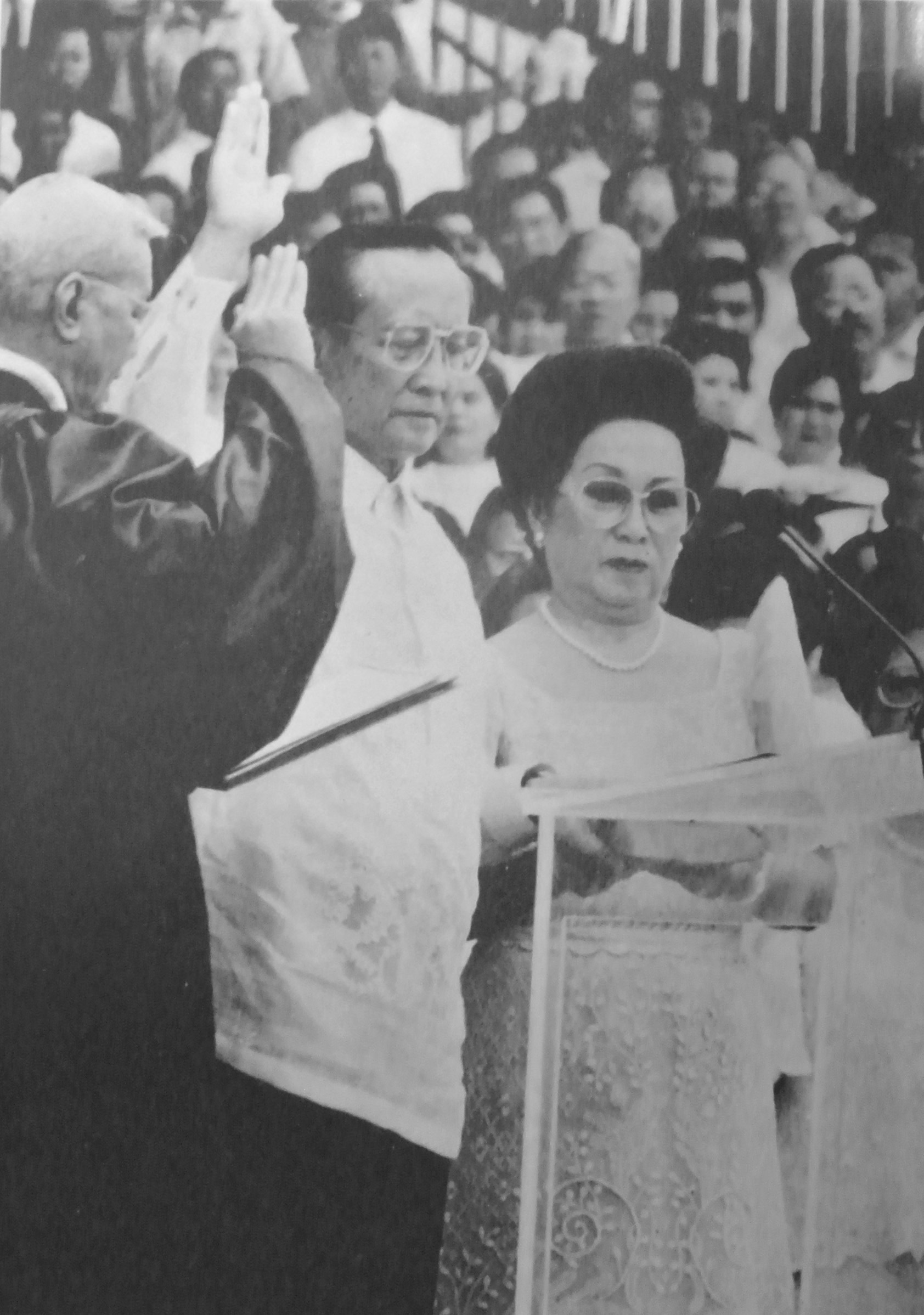
- Date: June 30, 1992; 33 years ago
- Location: Quirino Grandstand Manila
- Participants: President of the Philippines, Fidel Ramos Assuming office Chief Justice of the Supreme Court of the Philippines, Andres Narvasa Administering oath Vice President of the Philippines; Joseph Ejercito Estrada Assuming office Chief Justice of the Supreme Court of the Philippines, Andres Narvasa Administering oath Transition Team of Fidel V. Ramos and Presidential Transition Coordination Team

The inauguration of Fidel V. Ramos as the twelfth president of the Philippines took place on Tuesday, June 30, 1992, at the Quirino Grandstand in Manila. The oath of office was administered by Chief Justice of the Supreme Court of the Philippines Andres Narvasa.

The Inauguration was organized jointly by the Presidential Transition Cooperation Team of outgoing President Corazon Aquino and the Transition Team of incoming President Ramos.

== Context ==
=== Inaugural ceremony ===
The inauguration took place at the Quirino Grandstand in Manila, as mentioned by president Corazon Aquino on her final State of the Nation Address in 1991. Among those in attendance were outgoing president Aquino, outgoing vice president Salvador Laurel, former president Diosdado Macapagal and former first lady Eva Macapagal.

=== Oath of office ===
The oath of office was administered by Supreme Court Chief Justice Andres Narvasa, as per tradition. At noon PST (UTC+08), Ramos recited the following, as prescribed by the Constitution:

Ako, si Fidel Valdez Ramos, ay taimtim na nanunumpa na tutuparin ko nang buong katapatan at sigasig ang aking mga tungkulin bilang Pangulo ng Pilipinas, pangangalagaan at ipagtatanggol ang kanyang Konstitusyon, ipatutupad ang mga batas nito, magiging makatarungan sa bawat tao, at itatalaga ang aking sarili sa paglilingkod sa Bansa. Kasihan nawa ako ng Diyos.

This is also the first inauguration after the ratification of the 1987 Constitution and the first inauguration after the 1986 EDSA Revolution.

After taking office, Ramos delivered his inaugural speech that lasted for almost 30 minutes.

=== Post-inaugural event ===
After the inaugural ceremony, President Ramos then proceeded to the Malacañang Palace to convene his Cabinet, wherein they discussed about resolving the Philippines's energy crisis.

== Gallery ==
Oath taking

Inaugural address
