= First inauguration of Carlos P. Garcia =

1957 Philippine presidential inauguration

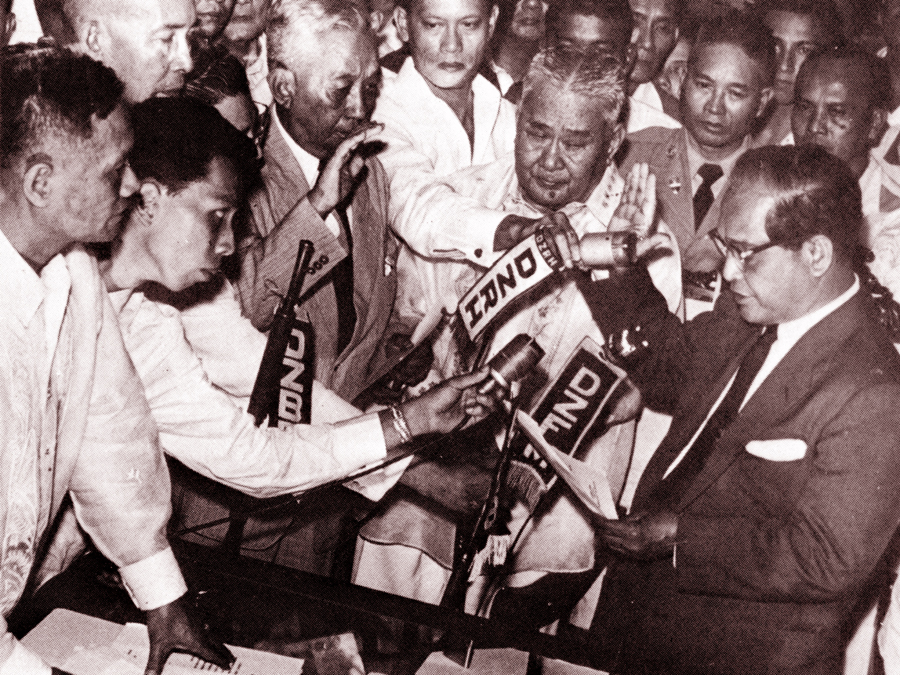
- Carlos P. García (right) was sworn in as the 8th president of the Philippines
- Date: March 18, 1957; 69 years ago
- Location: Malacañang Palace Manila
- Participants: President of the Philippines, Carlos P. Garcia Assuming office Chief Justice of the Supreme Court of the Philippines, Ricardo Paras Administering oath

The inauguration of Carlos P. Garcia as the eighth president of the Philippines took place at 5:56 PM (PHT) on Monday, March 18, 1957 at the Council of State Room of Malacañang Palace in Manila, following the death of President Ramon Magsaysay in a plane crash a day earlier. The third non-scheduled extraordinary inauguration marked the commencement of the first term (which lasted 9 months and 13 days) of Garcia as President. Chief Justice Ricardo Paras of the Supreme Court administered the oath of office. Garcia flew earlier that day to Manila from Australia, where he was leading the Philippine delegation to the SEATO conference then being held in Canberra when he learned of Magsaysay's tragic death.

== Inauguration ==
At 5:51 PM (PHT), Garcia met with the Magsaysay Cabinet to inform that "the President is dead." Five minutes later, he recited the following:

I, Carlos P. Garcia, of Talibon, province of Bohol, having succeeded to the Presidency of the Philippines by virtue of the provisions of Article VII, section 8 of the Constitution, do solemnly swear that I will faithfully and conscientiously fulfill my duties as President of the Philippines, preserve and defend its Constitution, execute its laws, do justice to every man, and consecrate myself to the service of the Nation. So help me, God.

Among those who witnessed the oathtaking was Senate President Eulogio Rodriguez. After taking oath of office, Garcia delivered his inaugural speech. Afterwards, he met his Cabinet for the first time to discuss the funeral arrangements for Magsaysay.
