= Second term of the presidency of Ferdinand Marcos =

Philippine political event

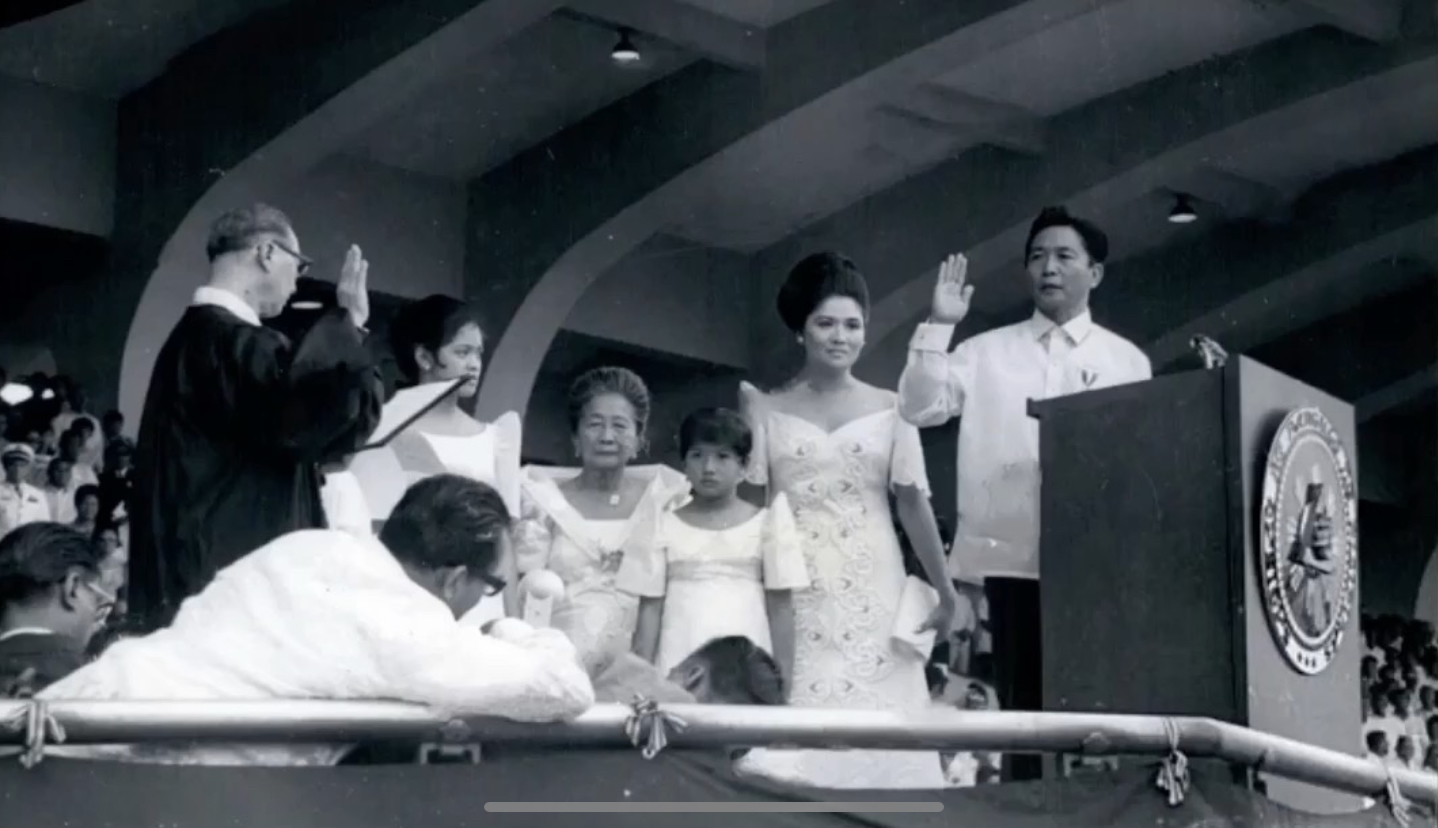
Marcos's presidential inauguration in 1969

Ferdinand Marcos's second term as President of the Philippines began on December 30, 1969, as a result of his winning the 1969 Philippine presidential election on November 11, 1969. Marcos was the first and last president of the Third Philippine Republic to win a second full term. The inauguration was at the Quirino Grandstand in Manila. The inauguration marked the commencement of the second four-year term of Ferdinand Marcos as president and the third term of Fernando Lopez as Vice President. The oath of office was administered by Chief Justice of the Supreme Court of the Philippines Roberto Concepcion.

The end of Marcos's second term was supposed to be in December 1973, which would also have been the end of his presidency because the 1935 Constitution of the Philippines allowed him to have only two four-year terms. However, Marcos issued Proclamation 1081 in September 1972, placing the entirety of the Philippines under Martial Law and effectively extending his term indefinitely. He would only be removed from the presidency in 1986, as a result of the People Power Revolution.

Marcos's first term, from 1965 to 1969, had been relatively successful, marked by industrialization, infrastructure development, and an increase in rice production. But in order to win his second term, which would be from 1969 to 1972, Marcos pursued a USD50 million spending spree on infrastructure projects meant to impress the electorate. This rapid spending resulted in a balance of payments crisis, which led Mr. Marcos to seek an adjustment program from the International Monetary Fund, the conditions for which included a reduction of selected tariff rates and a 43 percent monetary devaluation. The exchange rate plummeted from 3.9 Pesos to the U.S. Dollar in 1969 to 6 Pesos to the Dollar in 1970, leading to inflation, and eventually, general unrest.

== Inflation and social unrest ==
Marcos won the November 1969 election by a landslide and was inaugurated on December 30 of that year. But Marcos's massive spending during the 1969 presidential campaign had taken its toll and triggered growing public unrest. During the campaign, Marcos had spent 50 million dollars' worth in debt-funded infrastructure, triggering the 1969 Philippine balance of payments crisis. The Marcos administration ran to the International Monetary Fund (IMF) for help, and the IMF offered a debt restructuring deal. New policies, including a greater emphasis on exports and the relaxation of controls of the peso, were put in place. The Peso was allowed to float to a lower market value, resulting in drastic inflation, and social unrest.

Marcos's spending during the campaign led to opposition figures such as Senator Lorenzo M. Tañada, Senator Jovito R. Salonga, and Senator José W. Diokno to accuse Marcos of wanting to stay in power even beyond the two term maximum set for the presidency by the 1935 constitution.

== "Moderate" and "radical" opposition ==
The media reports of the time classified the various civil society groups opposing Marcos into two categories. The "Moderates", which included church groups, civil libertarians, and nationalist politicians, were those who wanted to create change through political reforms. The "radicals", including a number of labor and student groups, wanted broader, more systemic political reforms.

With the Constitutional Convention occupying their attention from 1971 to 1973, statesmen and politicians opposed to the increasingly more-authoritarian administration of Ferdinand Marcos mostly focused their efforts on political efforts from within the halls of power. This notably included the National Union of Students in the Philippines, and later the Movement of Concerned Citizens for Civil Liberties or MCCCL, led by Senator José W. Diokno. The MCCCL's rallies are particularly remembered for their diversity, attracting participants from both the moderate and radical camps; and for their scale, with the biggest one attended by as many as 50,000 people.

== First Quarter Storm ==
By the time Marcos gave the first State of the Nation Address of his second term on January 26, 1970, the unrest born from the 1969–1970 Balance of Payments Crisis exploded into a series of demonstrations, protests, and marches against the government. Student groups – some moderate and some radical – served as the driving force of the protests, which lasted until the end of the university semester in March 1970, and would come to be known as the "First Quarter Storm".

During Marcos's January 26, 1970, State of the Nation Address, the moderate National Union of Students of the Philippines organized a protested in front of Congress, and invited student groups both moderate and radical to join them. Some of the students participating in the protest harangued Marcos as he and his wife Imelda as they left the Congress building, throwing a coffin, a stuffed alligator, and stones at them.

The next major protest took place on January 30, in front of the presidential palace, where activists rammed the gate with a fire truck and once the gate broke and gave way, the activists charged into the Palace grounds tossing rocks, pillboxes, Molotov cocktails. At least two activists were confirmed dead and several were injured by the police.

== Constitutional Convention of 1971 ==
Expressing opposition to the Marcos's policies and citing rising discontent over wide inequalities in society, critics of Marcos began campaigning in 1967 to initiate a constitutional convention which would revise change the 1935 Constitution of the Philippines. On March 16 of that year, the Philippine Congress constituted itself into a Constituent Assembly and passed Resolution No. 2, which called for a Constitutional Convention to change the 1935 Constitution.

Marcos surprised his critics by endorsing the move, but historians later noted that the resulting Constitutional Convention would lay the foundation for the legal justifications Marcos would use to extend his term past the two four-year terms allowable under the 1935 Constitution.

A special election was held on November 10, 1970, to elect the delegates of the convention. Once the winners had been determined, the convention was convened on June 1, 1971 at the Manila Hotel before it was transferred in 1972 to the newly completed Quezon City Hall. A total of 320 delegates were elected to the convention, the most prominent being former senators Raul Manglapus and Roseller T. Lim. Other delegates would become influential political figures, including Hilario Davide, Jr., Marcelo Fernan, Sotero Laurel, Aquilino Pimentel, Jr., Teofisto Guingona, Jr., Raul Roco, Edgardo Angara, Richard Gordon, Margarito Teves, and Federico Dela Plana.

By 1972 the convention had already been bogged down by politicking and delays, when its credibility took a severe blow in May 1972 when a delegate exposed a bribery scheme in which delegates were paid to vote in favor of the Marcoses – with First Lady Imelda Marcos herself implicated in the alleged payola scheme.

The investigation on the scheme was effectively shelved when Marcos declared martial law in September 1972, and had 11 opposition delegates arrested. The remaining opposition delegates were forced to go either into exile or hiding. Within two months, an entirely new draft of the constitution was created from scratch by a special committee. The 1973 constitutional plebiscite was called to ratify the new constitution, but the validity of the ratification was brought to question because Marcos replaced the method of voting through secret ballot with a system of viva voce voting by "citizen's assemblies". The ratification of the constitution was challenged in what came to be known as the Ratification Cases.

== Plaza Miranda Bombing ==
The sociopolitical environment became even more dangerous with the Plaza Miranda bombing on the evening of August 21, 1971, during a political campaign rally of the opposition Liberal Party at Plaza Miranda in the district of Quiapo, Manila.

The bombing resulted in nine deaths and injured 95 others, including many prominent Liberal Party politicians.

Among those killed instantly were a 5-year-old child and The Manila Times photographer Ben Roxas. The political candidates who were on the stage were all injured, including incumbent Congressman for Palawan and soon to be Senator Ramon V. Mitra Jr. incumbent Senator Jovito Salonga, Senator Eddie Ilarde, Senator Eva Estrada-Kalaw, Liberal Party president Gerardo Roxas, Sergio Osmeña, Jr., son of former President of the Commonwealth of the Philippines, Sergio Osmeña, and Ramon Bagatsing, the party's Mayoral Candidate for the City of Manila.

== 1971 Suspension of the Writ of Habeas Corpus ==
As a response to the Plaza Miranda bombing, Marcos issued Proclamation No. 889, through which he assumed emergency powers and suspended the writ of habeas corpus – an act which would later be seen as a prelude to the declaration of Martial Law more than a year later.

Marcos's suspension of the writ of Habeas Corpus became the event that forced many members of the moderate opposition, including figures like Edgar Jopson, to join the ranks of the radicals. In the aftermath of the bombing, Marcos lumped all of the opposition together and referred to them as communists, and many former moderates fled to the mountain encampments of the radical opposition to avoid being arrested by Marcos's forces. Those who became disenchanted with the excesses of the Marcos administration and wanted to join the opposition after 1971 often joined the ranks of the radicals, simply because they represented the only group vocally offering opposition to the Marcos government.

== 1972 Manila bombings ==
Plaza Miranda was soon followed by a series of about twenty explosions which took place in various locations in Metro Manila in the months immediately proceeding Ferdinand Marcos's proclamation of Martial Law. The first of these bombings took place on March 15, 1972, and the last took place on September 11, 1972 – twelve days before martial law was announced on September 23 of that year.

The Marcos regime officially attributed the explosions communist "urban guerillas", and Marcos included them in the list of "inciting events" which served as rationalizations for his declaration of Martial Law. Marcos's political opposition at the time questioned the attribution of the explosions to the communists, noting that the only suspects caught in connection to the explosions were linked to the Philippine Constabulary.

The sites of the 1972 Manila bombings included the Palace Theater and Joe's Department Store on Carriedo Street, both in Manila; the offices of the Philippine Long Distance Telephone Company (PLDT), Filipinas Orient Airways, and Philippine American Life and General Insurance Company (PhilamLife); the Cubao branch of the Philippine Trust Company (now known as PhilTrust Bank); the Senate Publication Division and the Philippine Sugar Institute in Quezon City, and the South Vietnamese embassy.

However, only one of these incidents – the one in the Carriedo shopping mall – went beyond damage to property; one woman was killed and about 40 persons were injured.

== Martial Law ==
Marcos issued Proclamation 1081 in late September 1972, placing the entirety of the Philippines under Martial Law and effectively extending his presidency indefinitely.
