= Fourth inauguration of Ferdinand Marcos =

1986 Philippine presidential inauguration

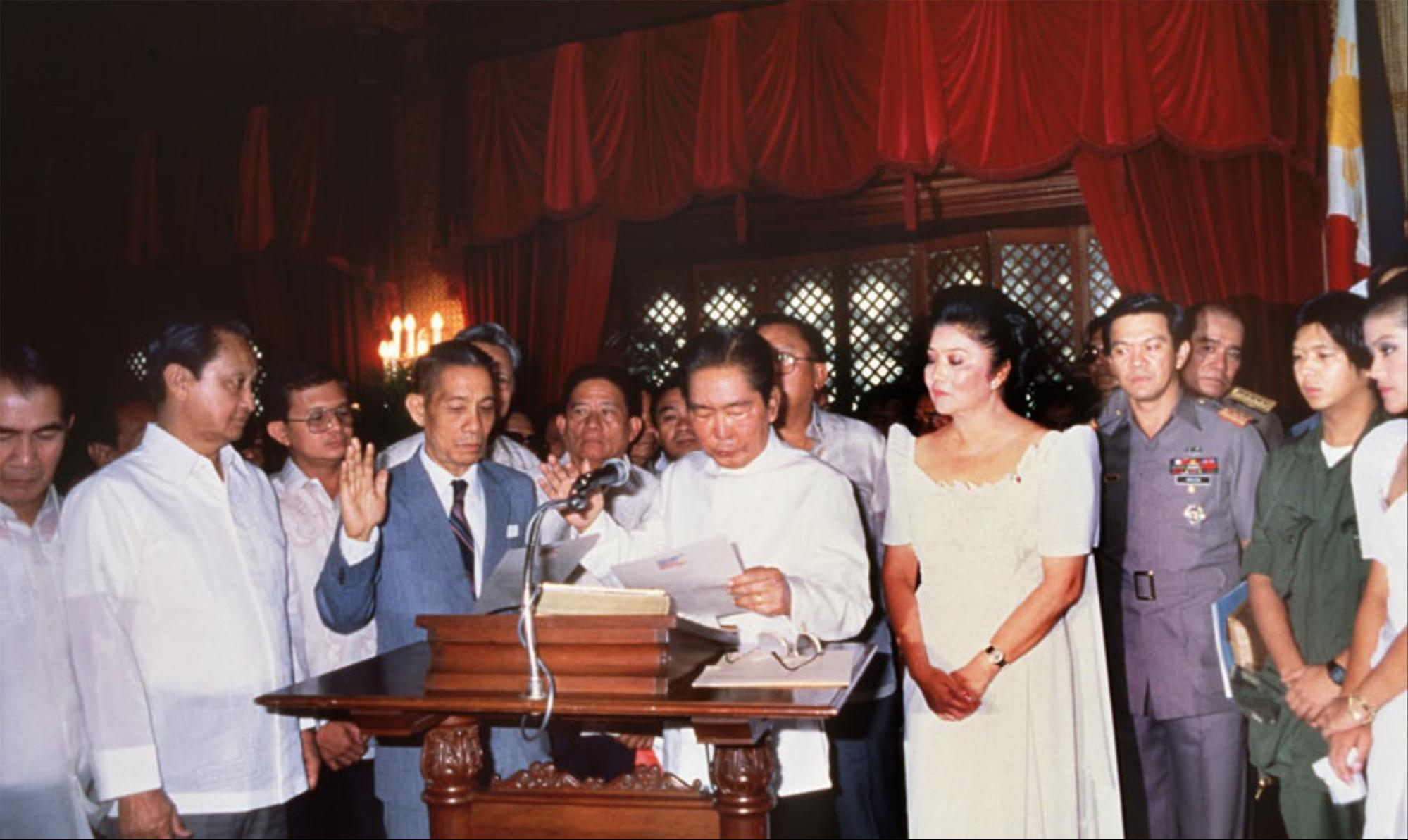
- Date: February 25, 1986; 40 years ago
- Location: Malacañan Palace Manila
- Participants: President of the Philippines, Ferdinand E. Marcos Assuming office Chief Justice of the Supreme Court of the Philippines, Ramon Aquino Administering oath

The fourth inauguration of Ferdinand Marcos as the tenth president of the Philippines took place on Tuesday, February 25, 1986, at Malacañang Palace in Manila. The inauguration marked the commencement of the fourth and final term of Ferdinand Marcos as president. Marcos eventually stepped down as president a few hours later while the 3-day mass demonstrations were taking place.

== Background ==
In November 1985, Ferdinand Marcos, who had been the president of the Philippines for almost 2 decades, announced a snap presidential election that took place on February 7, 1986, amidst the growing political tensions in the country that had followed the assassination of Benigno Aquino Jr., a prominent opposition leader and former senator, more than two years before. Marcos would run again for re-election with Arturo Tolentino as his running-mate. His main opponent was Corazon Aquino, the widow of former senator Aquino. In the official canvassing by the Commission on Elections, Marcos was prevailing while the National Movement for Free Elections favored Aquino. Despite massive fraud in the elections, the Batasang Pambansa proclaimed Marcos as the duly-elected president.

On February 22, 1986, then-Defense Minister Juan Ponce Enrile and then-Lieutenant General Fidel Ramos, who was the Vice Chief-of-Staff of the Armed Forces of the Philippines, broke away from the Marcos regime, signaling the start of the People Power Revolution.

== Inaugural events ==
On February 25, 1986, hours after Corazon Aquino took her oath as president of the Philippines, Marcos held his own inauguration at the Malacañang Palace, attended by thousands of his loyal supporters. Foreign dignitaries were unable to attend for security reasons. Marcos emerged from the balcony of Maharlika Hall in front of his loyalists who were waving Philippine flags, thanking him for their trust and support for 20 years.

== Television coverage ==
The coverage of the inauguration was televised over BBC Channel 2, RPN Channel 9 and IBC Channel 13, all owned by Marcos crony Roberto Benedicto, as the government's primary station, Channel 4, was taken over by rebels. However, it was cut-off as rebel soldiers captured the transmitter facility of Channel 9.
