= First term of the presidency of Ferdinand Marcos =

1965–1969 Philippine presidential term

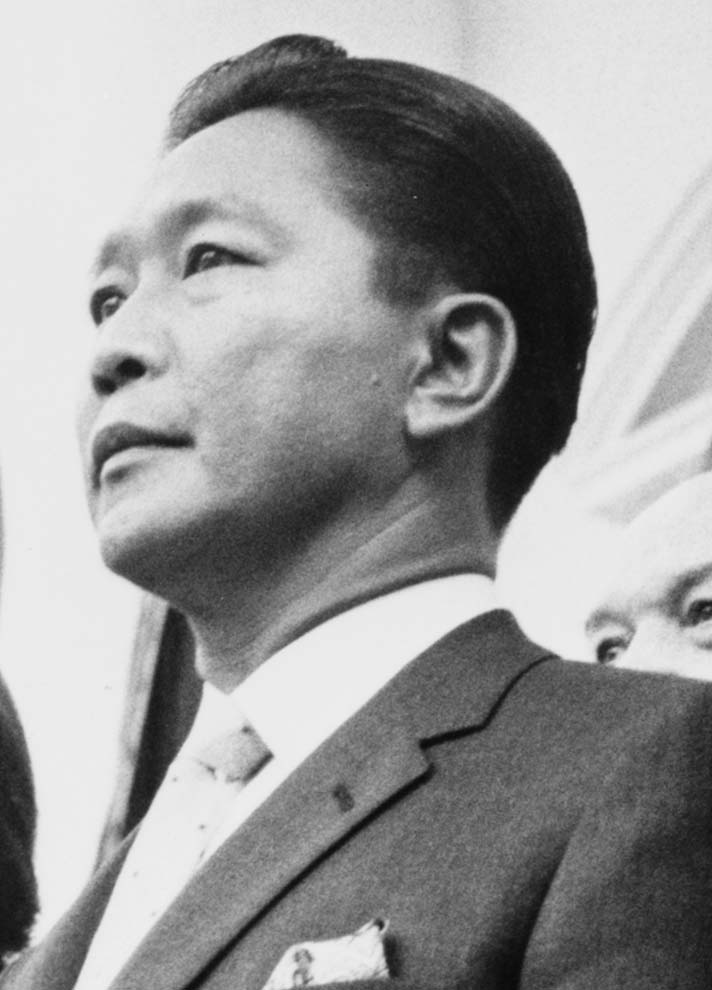
Marcos in 1966

Ferdinand Marcos was inaugurated to his first term as the 10th president of the Philippines on December 30, 1965. His inauguration marked the beginning of his two-decade long stay in power, even though the 1935 Philippine Constitution had set a limit of only two four-year terms of office. Marcos had won the Philippine presidential election of 1965 against the incumbent president, Diosdado Macapagal.

Before Marcos's Presidency, the Philippines was the second largest economy in Asia, behind only Japan. He pursued an aggressive program of infrastructure development funded by foreign loans, making him very popular throughout almost all of his first term and eventually making him the first and only President of the Third Philippine republic to win a second term, although it would also trigger an inflationary crisis which would lead to social unrest in his second term, and would eventually lead to his declaration of Martial Law in 1972.

== 1965 election campaign ==
Ferdinand Marcos always had the ambition to be the president of the Philippines. In his campaign for the 1949 elections, he declared that if he would be elected as congressman, he promise to have an Ilocano president in 20 years' time. Marcos slowly ascended into power and then attempted to run as president in 1961, but he lost to Macapagal in the nominations.

At the time of the 1965 elections, Marcos was a member of the Liberal Party (LP), becoming Senate President during Macapagal's term. Marcos found his ambitions to run for president blocked for a second time when Macapagal decided to run for a second term, so Marcos jumped from the LP to the Nacionalista Party (NP), eventually becoming the NP's candidate for president, winning against Vice President Emmanuel Pelaez in the NP nominations for the presidency.

An acknowledged "master of populist imagery", Marcos projected a persona of youth and virility, having himself photographed by rice farmers in their fields. He also cast himself as a war hero, claiming to be the "most decorated war hero of the Philippines" on the strength of 27 supposed war medals and decorations which were later revealed to be mostly propaganda, being inaccurate or untrue.

Marcos won the election with 51.94% of the vote, Macapagal having garnered 42.88% while Raul Manglapus of the Party for Philippine Progress got 5.17%. About 0.01%. of the votes went to nine other candidates who ran for the post under various independent parties.

== Inauguration ==
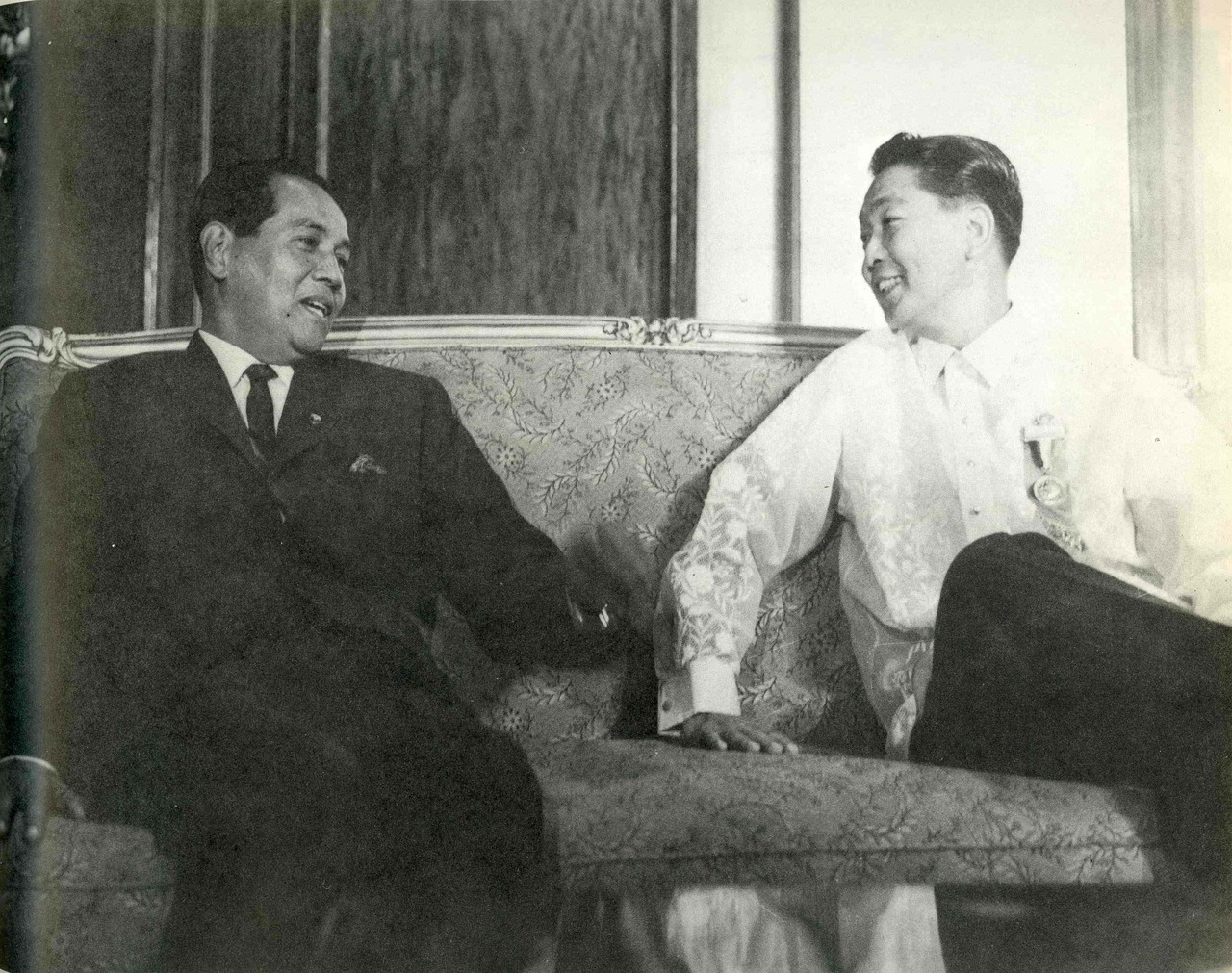
President-elect Marcos (right) is received by outgoing President Diosdado Macapagal (left) at the Malacañang Palace Music Room.

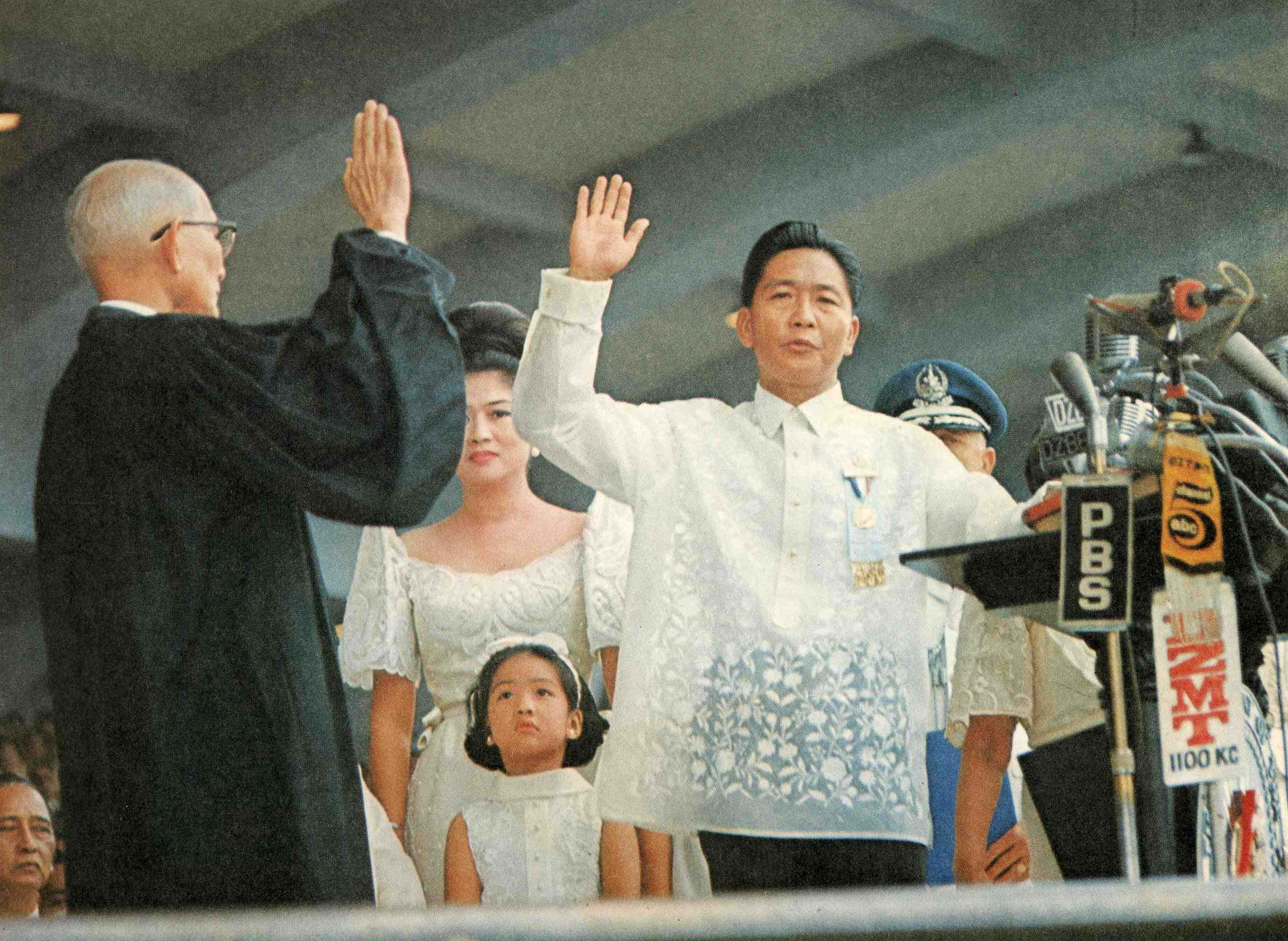
Marcos presidential inauguration in 1965

Marcos was inaugurated on Thursday, December 30, 1965 at the Quirino Grandstand in Manila. The inauguration marked the beginning of the first four-year term of Ferdinand Marcos as President and second four-year term of Fernando Lopez as Vice President. The oath of office was administered by Chief Justice of the Supreme Court of the Philippines César Bengzon.

Prior to the inaugural ceremony, President-elect Marcos met with outgoing President Diosdado Macapagal, whom he defeated in the 1965 election, at the Malacañang Palace. After briefly praying together at the Malacañang chapel, they proceeded to the Quirino Grandstand for the military honors. After which, Macapagal returned to Malacañang. Manila Archbishop Rufino Cardinal Santos led the invocation, followed by the oath taking of Vice President-elect Fernando Lopez and President-elect Marcos administered by Chief Justice César Bengzon. Marcos swore his oath on two closed family Bibles, one owned by his father Mariano and another given by his wife Imelda; one of the Bibles would later be used by his son Ferdinand Jr. in his inauguration in 2022. Marcos then delivered his inaugural speech.

== Administration and cabinet ==
Upon winning the election, Marcos appointed a cabinet composed mostly of technocrats and intellectuals, most notably Executive Secretary Rafael Salas, Education Secretary Onofre Corpuz, Finance Secretary Cesar Virata, and National Economic and Development Authority Director General Gerardo Sicat.

=== Agricultural and rural development projects ===
In an effort to strengthen the influence of the Office of the President and simultaneously weaken the strong patronage bonds which rural Filipinos had with their local leaders, Marcos created the Presidential Arm on Community Development (PACD), which would initiate development projects at the barrio level without going through the Barrio and Municipal governments.

Marcos also took credit for the dramatic increase in rice production caused by the 1968 introduction of a new "miracle rice" variety, IR8, by the International Rice Research Institute in Los Baños, Laguna—although the IRRI program that developed the variety had started as early as 1962, during the Macapagal administration, and was the product of an International consortium, not the Philippine government.

=== Formation of industrial monopolies ===
During this first term, Marcos also began systematically cultivating a group entrepreneurs and industrialists loyal to him, rather than the Philippines' ruling class of landowners, making these cronies richer and more powerful through what would later be called "behest loans", which funnelled foreign assistance and "soft loans" to their businesses on the pretense of spurring industrial development.

=== Expansion of the Philippine military ===
One of Marcos's earliest initiatives upon becoming president was to significantly expand the Philippine military. In an unprecedented move, Marcos chose to concurrently serve as his own Defense Secretary, allowing him to have a direct hand in running the military. He also significantly increased the budget of the armed forces, tapping them in civil projects such as the construction of schools. Generals loyal to Marcos were allowed to stay in their positions past their retirement age, or were rewarded with civilian government posts, leading Senator Benigno S. Aquino Jr. to accuse Marcos in 1968 of trying to establish "a garrison state."

==== Sending troops to the Vietnam War ====
Under intense pressure from the administration of Lyndon B. Johnson, Marcos reversed his pre-presidency position of not sending Philippine forces to Vietnam War, and consented to a limited involvement, asking Congress to approve sending a combat engineer unit. Despite opposition to the new plan, the Marcos government gained Congressional approval and Philippine troops were sent from the middle of 1966 as the Philippines Civic Action Group (PHILCAG). PHILCAG reached a strength of some 1,600 troops in 1968 and between 1966 and 1970 over 10,000 Filipino soldiers served in South Vietnam, mainly being involved in civilian infrastructure projects.

=== Loans for mass infrastructure development ===
With an eye towards becoming the first president of the third republic to be reelected to a second term, the Marcos administration began taking up massive foreign loans to fund "rice, roads, and schoolbuildings"—the lynchpin slogan of his reelection campaign. The Omnibus Tax Law of 1969 was passed too late by congress to be useful to Marcos's publicity efforts, and at any rate, did not succeed in raising significant new funds. So it was foreign loans that funded the 70% increase in infrastructure spending from 1966 to 1970 (compared to the Macapagal administration's spending from 1961 to 1965) which included the North Luzon Expressway and the Maharlika Highway, and the construction of 58, 745 pre-fabricated and 38,705 regular schoolbuildings. The first Marcos administration's budget deficit was thus 72% higher than the Philippine government's annual deficit from 1961 to 1965.

This began a pattern of loan-funded spending which the Marcos administration would continue until the Marcoses were deposed in 1986, resulting in economic instability still being felt to this day, and of debts that experts say the Philippines will have to keep paying well into 2025. The grandest infrastructure projects of Marcos's first term, especially the Cultural Center of the Philippines complex, also marked the beginning of what critics would call Ferdinand Marcos and First Lady Imelda Marcos's edifice complex, with many grand public infrastructures projects prioritized for public funding because of their effective propaganda value.

=== The Beatles' 1966 visit and controversy ===
The Beatles arrived in Manila on 3 July 1966 to huge fanfare as part of their 1966 world tour. The band was scheduled to play two concerts at Rizal Memorial Stadium at 4 pm and 8:30 pm on 4 July. President and First Lady Marcos also scheduled a televised reception for the Beatles at Malacañang Palace at 11 am; the band was not aware of their expected attendance, as manager Brian Epstein had declined the invitation in keeping with a group policy not to attend political engagements. The Beatles failed to appear for the palace reception, leading Imelda to remark that they had let her down as children in attendance wept.

This apparent "snub" of the First Lady generated a significant national controversy and led to the Beatles' security being withdrawn from their hotel, as well as groups of young men harassing the band at the concert venue and at the airport before their departure on 5 July. Just before their flight departed, Epstein was summoned off the plane and presented with a tax bill from the Bureau of Internal Revenue.

Soon after the Beatles had left Manila on 5 July, President Marcos issued a statement acknowledging that the group had not purposely snubbed the First Family. He attributed the violent scenes at the airport to citizens overreacting to a "misunderstanding", and announced that he had lifted the tax on the band's earnings in the Philippines.

== Jabidah exposé and Muslim reactions ==
In March 1968 a Muslim man named Jibin Arula was fished out of the waters of Manila Bay, having been shot. He was brought to then-Cavite Governor Delfin N. Montano, to whom he recounted the story of the Jabidah Massacre, saying that numerous Moro army recruits had been executed en-masse by members of the Armed Forces of the Philippines (AFP) on March 18, 1968. This became the subject of a senate exposé by opposition Senator Benigno Aquino Jr.

Although the lack of living witnesses other than Arula severely hampered the probes on the incident, it became a major flashpoint that ignited the Moro insurgency in the Philippines. Despite undergoing numerous trials and hearings, none of the officers implicated in the massacre were ever convicted, leading many Filipino Muslims to believe that the "Christian" government in Manila had little regard for them. This created a furor within the Muslim community in the Philippines, especially among the educated youth, and among Muslim intellectuals, who had no discernible interest in politics prior to the incident. Educated or not, the story of the Jabidah massacre led many Filipino Muslims to believe that all opportunities for integration and accommodation with the Christians were lost and further marginalised.

This eventually led to the formation of the Mindanao Independence Movement in 1968, the Bangsamoro Liberation Organization (BMLO) in 1969, and the consolidation of these various forces into the Moro National Liberation Front (MNLF) in October 1972.

== Re-election campaign, 1969 ==
When the time came for the Philippine Presidential election of 1969, it was taken for granted that Ferdinand Marcos and Fernando Lopez would be unanimously nominated as the respective presidential and vice presidential candidates of the Nacionalista party. Nevertheless, the party's ruling junta met in Makati a week earlier before the July 1969 Nacionalista Party National Convention at the Manila Pavilion, in order to assure that the nomination would be unanimous. The duo went against the Liberal Party's candidates, Sergio Osmena, Jr and Genaro Magsaysay.

With his popularity already beefed up by debt-funded spending, Marcos's popularity made it very likely that he would win the election, but he decided, as National Artist for Literature Nick Joaquin reported in the Philippines Free Press, "leave nothing to chance." Time and Newsweek would eventually call the 1969 election the "dirtiest, most violent and most corrupt" in Philippine modern history, with the term "Three Gs", meaning "guns, goons, and gold" coined to describe administration's election tactics of vote-buying, terrorism and ballot snatching.

Marcos used the military and the government bureaucracy for his campaign, and also went on a campaign spending spree, initiating US$50 million worth in infrastructure projects meant to impress the electorate.

The most infamous incidents of violence took place in Batanes, where Philippine Constabulary officers, paramilitary groups and hired guns essentially took over the island, and motorcycle-riding thugs rode around terrorizing voters and Comelec officials, and beating up opposition leaders.

=== 1969 Philippine balance of payments crisis ===
Rapid campaign spending was so massive that it would be responsible for the Balance of Payments Crisis of 1970. Marcos was reported to have spent PhP 100 for every PhP 1 that Osmena spent, using up PhP 24 Million in Cebu alone. By the following year, however, the government would be unable to pay its debts, and would decide to enter into a debt rescheduling arrangement plan with the International Monetary Fund. The stabilization plan involved in the agreement included numerous macroeconomic interventions, such as significantly devaluating the Philippine Peso. However, the inflationary effect these interventions had on the local economy brought about the social unrest which motivated the proclamation of Martial Law in 1972.

== 1969 Marcos reelection victory ==
The 1969 elections were held on November 11, and Marcos won an unprecedented second full term as President of the Philippines. His running mate, incumbent Vice President Fernando Lopez was also elected to a third full term as Vice President of the Philippines, but was later ousted from his position due to his denunciations of Marcos following the declaration of martial law in 1972.
