= Vin d'honneur =

Event on New Year's Day and Independence Day

A vin d'honneur is one of two official receptions hosted by the president of the Philippines at Malacañan Palace on New Year's Day and Independence Day. The custom derives from the New Year's Day receptions hosted by the American governors-general that were ultimately derived from the receptions held by the British sovereign. The ceremony was continued by Manuel Quezon and his successors who held it in the afternoons, and it was termed "at home day" or "open house" in reference to the fact that the president and his consort opened the palace to visitors from different sectors of society.

The modern ceremony was reinstated and received its present name in 1987 under Corazón Aquino. It is now held on the morning of a convenient date immediately following New Year's Day, and has since evolved from a generally social custom into a diplomatic function. The iconic highlight of the ceremony is the toast between the president and the papal nuncio who, despite the country having no official religion, retains his position as dean of the diplomatic corps due to Spanish influence on Filipino culture.

The name vin d'honneur means "wine of honour" in French.
