= Jimenez v. Cañizares =

Supreme Court Case ruling

- Court: Supreme Court of the Philippines en banc

Full case name
- Joel Jimenez v. Remedios Cañizares, Republic of the Philippines
- Decided: August 31 1960
- G.R. number: L-12790
- Citation: 109 Phil. 273

Case history
- Appealed from: Zamboanga Regional Trial Court
- Argument: Oral argument

Questions presented
- Whether or not respondent's impotency has been established, Whether or not the marriage in question may be annulled on the strength only of the lone testimony of the husband who claimed and testified that his wife was and is impotent

Ruling
- Impotency being an abnormal condition should not be presumed. The presumption is in favor of potency. The party alleging the impotency; has the burden of proving the same

Court membership
- Judge(s) sitting: Ricardo Paras, César Bengzon, Felix Angelo Bautista, Alejo Labrador, Roberto Concepcion, J.B.L. Reyes, Jesus Barrera, Jose Gutierrez David, Arsenio Dizon
- Concurrence: Paras, Bengzon, Angelo Bautista, Labrador, Conception, Reyes, Gutierrez David, Dizon

Laws applied
- Section 1, Paragraph 18, Article III, Constitution of the Philippines

Jimenez v. Cañizares, 109 Phil. 273 (1960), is a 1960 landmark decision of the Supreme Court of the Philippines which declares that the presumption of impotency is not valid for filling an annulment of marriage. The court further added that the ground for annulment is not based on mutual agreement of the parties but instead, it is based on legal grounds.

== Background ==
On June 3, 1950, Joel Jimenez married Remedios Cañizares through a civil wedding before a judge of municipal court of Zamboanga City. Jimenez left the conjugal home two nights after they married because Cañizares' genitals is too small for a penis to penatrate and to consummate the marriage; five years later, on June 7, 1955, Jimenez filed for annulment in Zamboanga Regional Trial Court. On June 14, 1955, Remedios was summoned and served a copy of the complaint but she did not file an answer, In pursuant to the provisions of the article 88 of the Civil Code of the Philippines, the court asked the City Attorney of Zamboanga on September 29, 1956, to find for evidence and to inquire Remedios whether there was a collusion, in order to determine that the evidence of the plaintiff is not a frame-up, concoted or fabricated. On December 17, 1956, the court ordered Remedios to submit to a physical examination by a competent female physician to determine her capacity to consummate the marriage, and submit the medical result within ten days from receipt of the court's order. On March 14, 1957, court granted Remedios additional five days from notice to comply to the order of December 17, 1956 with a warning that if she failed to undergo medical examination and to submit a medical report, would be deemed a lack of interest on her part in the case and the judgement in the case will be rendered. A hearing occurred but Remedios was absent, so on April 11, 1957, the court decree the annulment of their marriage.

== Argument ==
On April 26, 1957, the city attorney filed for a motion for reconsideration, the city attorney argues that in the case of Jimenez and Cañizares has no ground for annulment because the defendant's impotency has not been satisfactorily established as required by the law. The city attorney added that, instead of annulling the marriage, the court should contempt her in court because she has not been physically examined because she refused to be examined and the court should compel her to undergo a physical examination and submit a medical certificate; and that the decree sought to be reconsidered, the city attorney further added that, the reconsideration of the case will open the doors to the married couples who want to end their marriage by colluding with each other by just alleging impotency of one of them. But on May 13, 1957, the motion for reconsideration was denied.

== Ruling ==
The Supreme Court dismissed the case, and the decree appealed the case into the lower courts for further proceedings, the Court ruled that "Impotency being an abnormal condition should not be presumed. The presumption is in favor of potency." The Supreme Court added that Remedios' impotency was not satisfactorily decided because she refused or abstained from taking part in proceedings, the court considered that woman in the country are by nature coy, bashful and shy and would not submit to a physical examination unless compelled by a competent authority. The court further replied and said, they may do without infringing on her constitutional right and she is not to be compelled to be a witness against himself. And the Supreme Court also ruled that a lone testimony of a spouse against her/his spouse is physically incapable of consummating the marriage is insufficient to annul the marriage and it should be supported by evidence.
