= José Abad Santos =

Chief Justice of the Philippines from 1941 to 1942

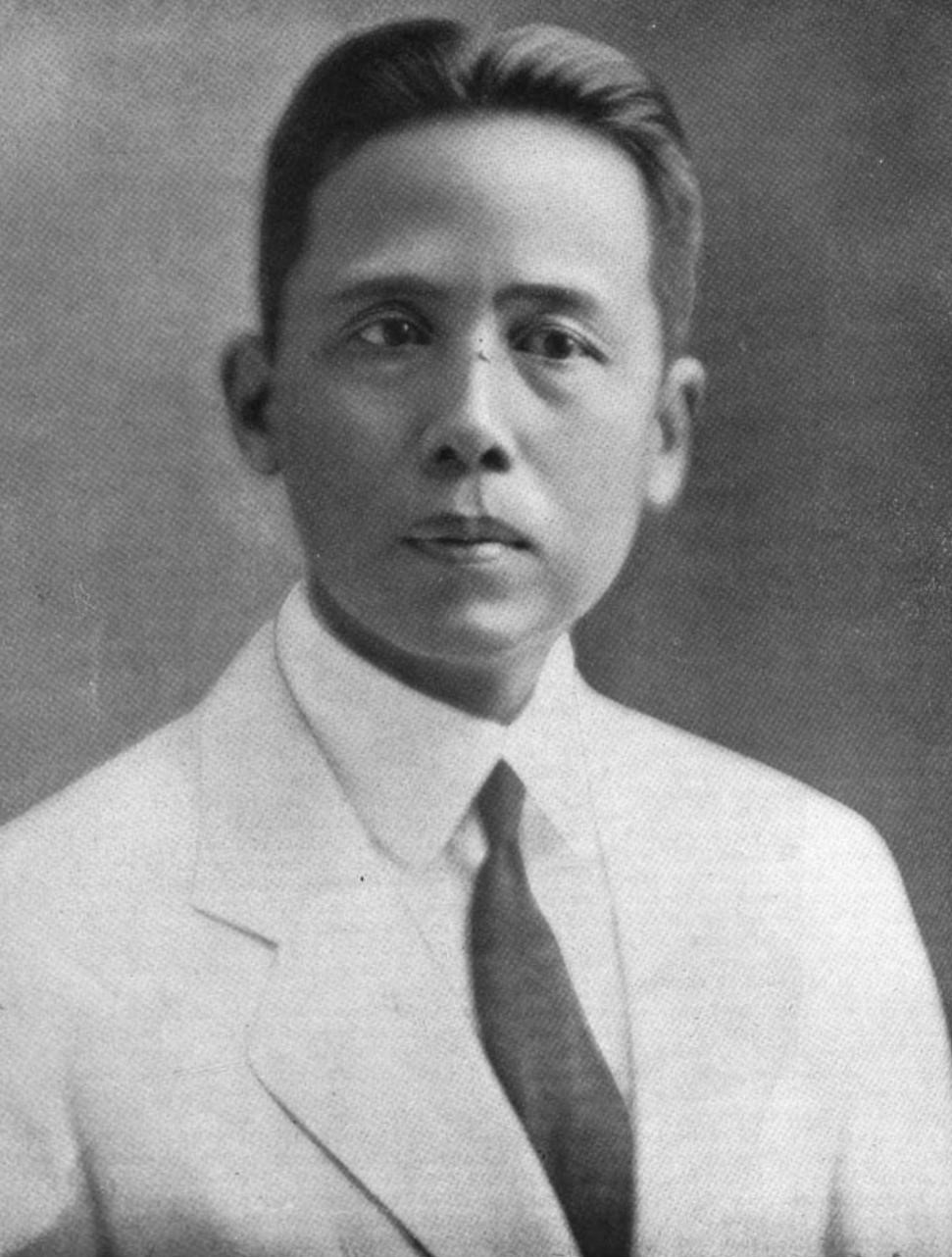
- Photograph from The Commercial & Industrial Manual of the Philippines, 1941

Acting President of the Philippines
- Caretaker
- In office March 17, 1942 – May 1, 1942
- Appointed by: Manuel L. Quezon

5th Chief Justice of the Supreme Court
- In office December 24, 1941 – May 1, 1942
- Appointed by: Manuel L. Quezon
- Preceded by: Ramón Avanceña
- Succeeded by: José Yulo

28th Associate Justice of the Supreme Court
- In office June 18, 1936 – December 23, 1941
- Nominated by: Herbert Hoover
- Preceded by: Norberto Romuáldez
- Succeeded by: José Lopez Vito

Secretary of Justice
- In office December 5, 1938 – July 16, 1941
- President: Manuel L. Quezon
- Preceded by: José Yulo
- Succeeded by: Teófilo Sison
- In office September 1, 1928 – June 18, 1932
- Appointed by: Governor-General Henry L. Stimson
- Succeeded by: Alexander Reyes
- In office April 26, 1922 – July 17, 1923
- Appointed by: Governor-General Leonard Wood
- Preceded by: Quintín Paredes
- Succeeded by: Luis Torres

Secretary of Finance
- In office December 30, 1941 – March 26, 1942
- President: Manuel L. Quezon
- Preceded by: Serafín Marabut
- Succeeded by: Andrés Soriano (as Secretary of Finance, Agriculture, and Commerce)

Personal details
- Born: José Abad Santos y Basco; February 19, 1886 San Fernando, Pampanga, Captaincy General of the Philippines, Spanish East Indies
- Died: May 1, 1942 (aged 56) Malabang, Lanao, Philippines
- Cause of death: Execution by firing squad
- Party: Independent
- Spouse: Amanda Teopaco (m. 1918)
- Relations: Pedro Abad Santos (brother); Vicente Abad Santos (nephew); Jamby Madrigal (granddaughter); Bong Suntay (great-grandson)
- Children: José Abad Santos Jr. (nicknamed Pepito); Luz Abad Santos; Amanda Abad Santos (nicknamed Mandy); Osmundo Abad Santos (nicknamed Ossie); Victoria Abad Santos (nicknamed Vicky)
- Education: Santa Clara College, CA; Northwestern University, IL (LLB); George Washington University, Washington, D.C. (LLM)
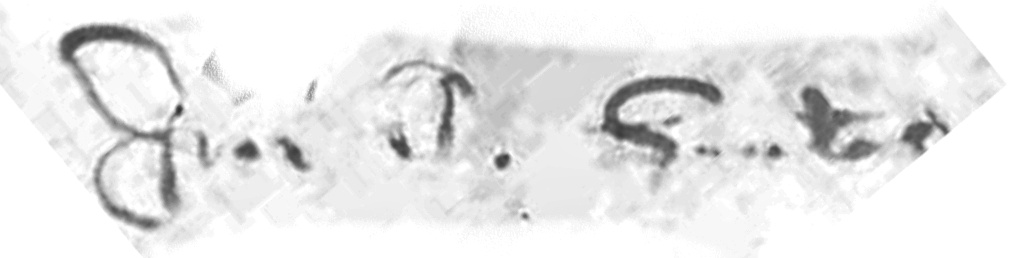
- Signature

José Abad Santos y Basco (Spanish: [xoˈse aˈβað ˈsantos], Tagalog: [hoˈse ʔaˈbad ˈsantos]; February 19, 1886 – May 1, 1942) was a Filipino statesman, jurist, and politician who served as the fifth chief justice of the Supreme Court. He briefly served as the acting president of the Commonwealth of the Philippines and acting commander-in-chief of the Armed Forces of the Philippines during World War II, from March 1942 until his execution. (Note: He was elevated after the government of Manuel L. Quezon went in exile to the United States.) Japanese forces killed him for refusing to cooperate during their occupation of the country.

Together with Josefa Llanes Escoda and Vicente Lim, he is memorialized on the non-polymer version of the Philippines' 1,000-Peso banknote depicting Filipinos who fought and died resisting the Japanese occupation of the Philippines during World War II.

== Early life and legal career ==
José Abad Santos was born on February 19, 1886, in San Fernando, Pampanga. He was the seventh of the ten children of Vicente Abad Santos and Toribia Basco. His brother Pedro eventually emerged as a leading socialist leader during the Commonwealth era. He finished his early education in his hometown. In 1904, he was sent to the United States as a government pensioner. He finished a pre-law course at the Santa Clara College in Santa Clara, California; his Bachelor of Laws at Northwestern University in Evanston, Illinois; and his Master of Laws at George Washington University in 1909. He was admitted to the Philippine Bar and passed in 1911 and later served as assistant attorney at the Bureau of Justice from 1913 to 1917.

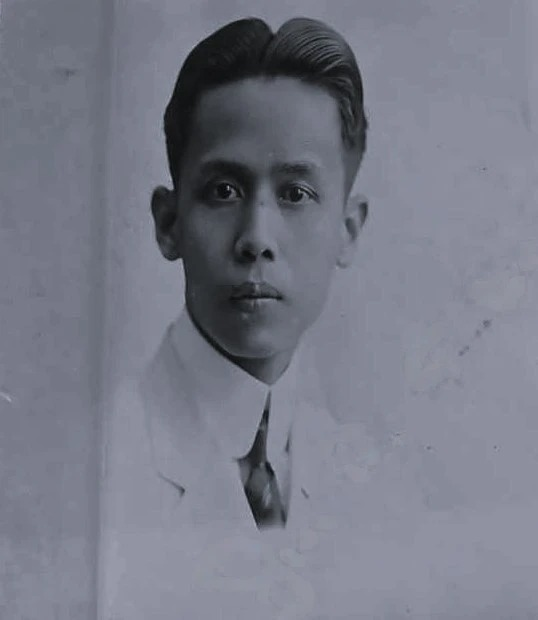
Abad Santos in 1919

In 1919, Abad Santos was instrumental in laying the legal groundwork, as well as drafting the by-laws and constitution of the Philippine Women's University, the country and Asia's first private non-sectarian women's institute of higher learning.

== Role in the Philippine government ==
=== Department of Justice ===
Abad Santos was later appointed as the first Filipino corporate lawyer of the Philippine National Bank, Manila Railroad Company and other government corporations. He went to the Department of Justice, where he became attorney-general, undersecretary of justice, then secretary of justice from 1921 to 1923. In July 1923, he resigned as secretary of justice together with other department secretaries as a result of the controversy between Governor-General Leonard Wood and Filipino leaders.

=== Chief Justice ===
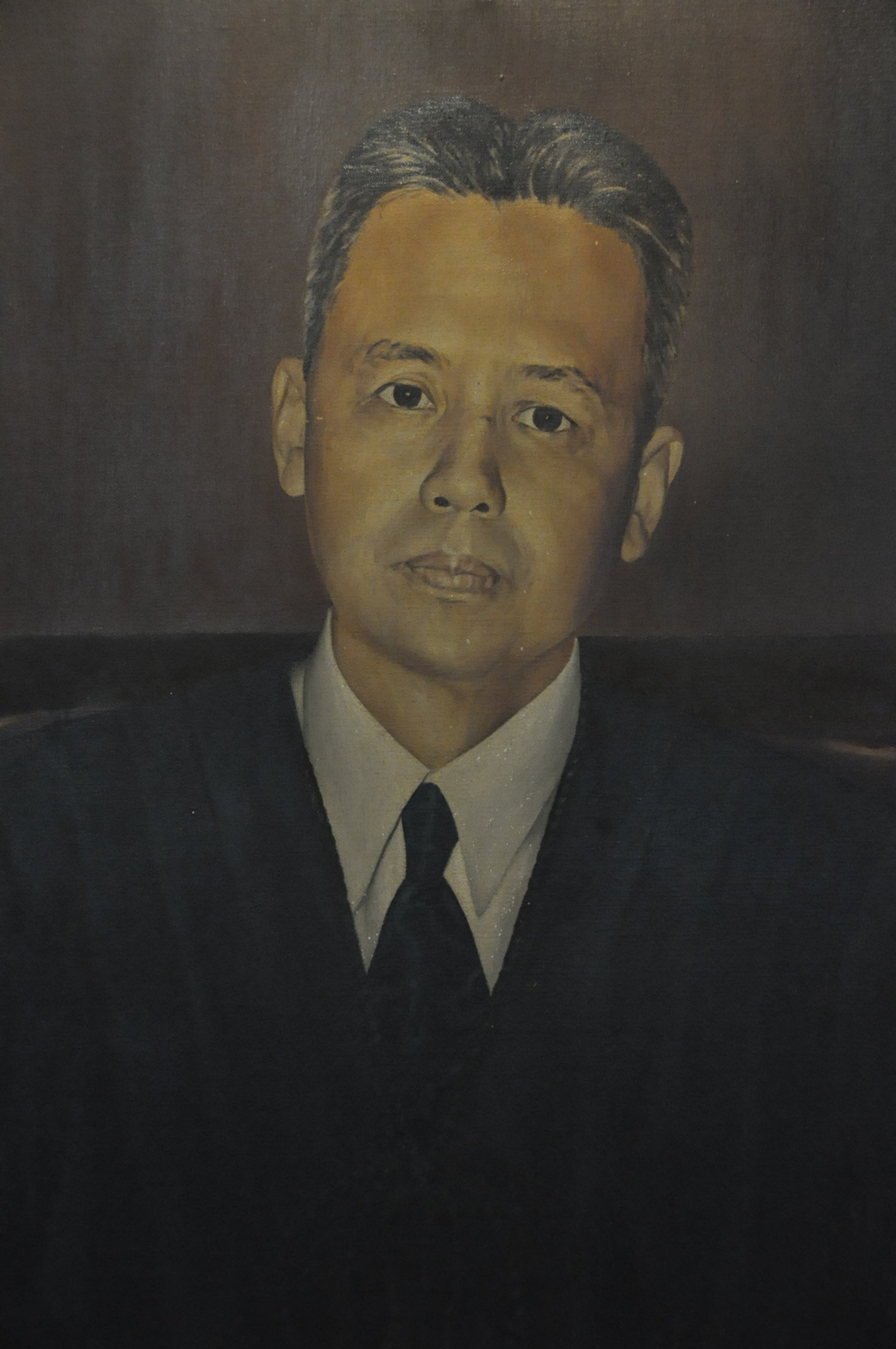
Portrait as Chief Justice

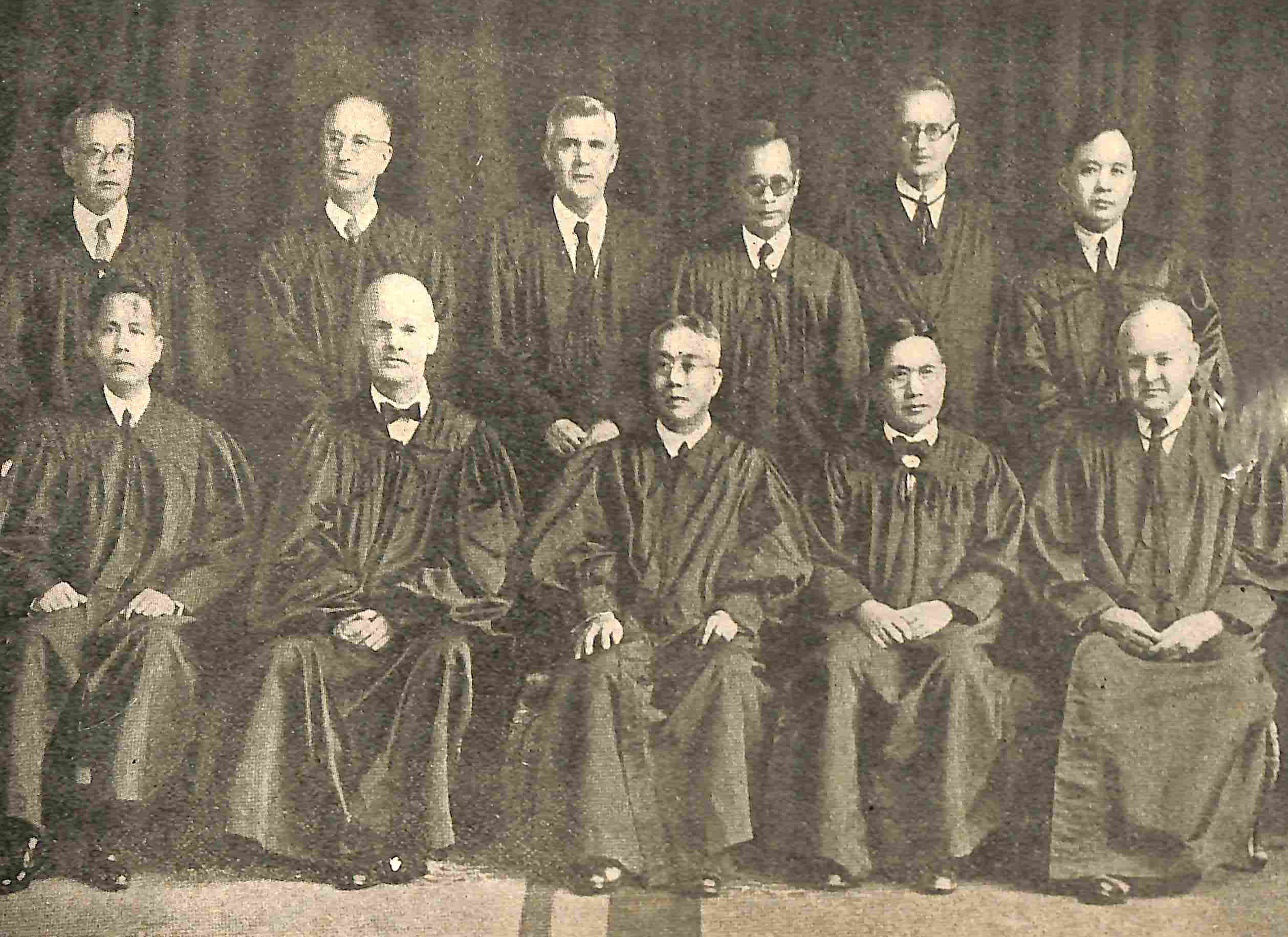
José Abad Santos (seated from left) in 1935

Abad Santos then served as chief counsel of the president of the Senate and the speaker of the House of Representatives of the Philippines. In 1926, he went to the United States as head of the Philippine educational mission. He was again appointed secretary of justice in 1928 and re-appointed on July 1, 1931. In 1932, he became an associate justice of the Supreme Court. He became its chief justice on December 24, 1941. As part of the emergency reorganization of the Commonwealth government, Abad Santos, in his capacity as chief justice, was given the responsibilities previously handled by the secretary of justice (the position of secretary of justice was abolished for the duration of the war). Abad Santos accompanied the Commonwealth government to Corregidor, where on December 30, 1941, he administered the oath of office to President Quezon and Vice-President Osmeña for the second term to which they had been elected in November of that year. He also undertook, with Manuel Roxas, the supervision of the destruction of Commonwealth government currency to prevent its falling into enemy hands.

== World War II ==
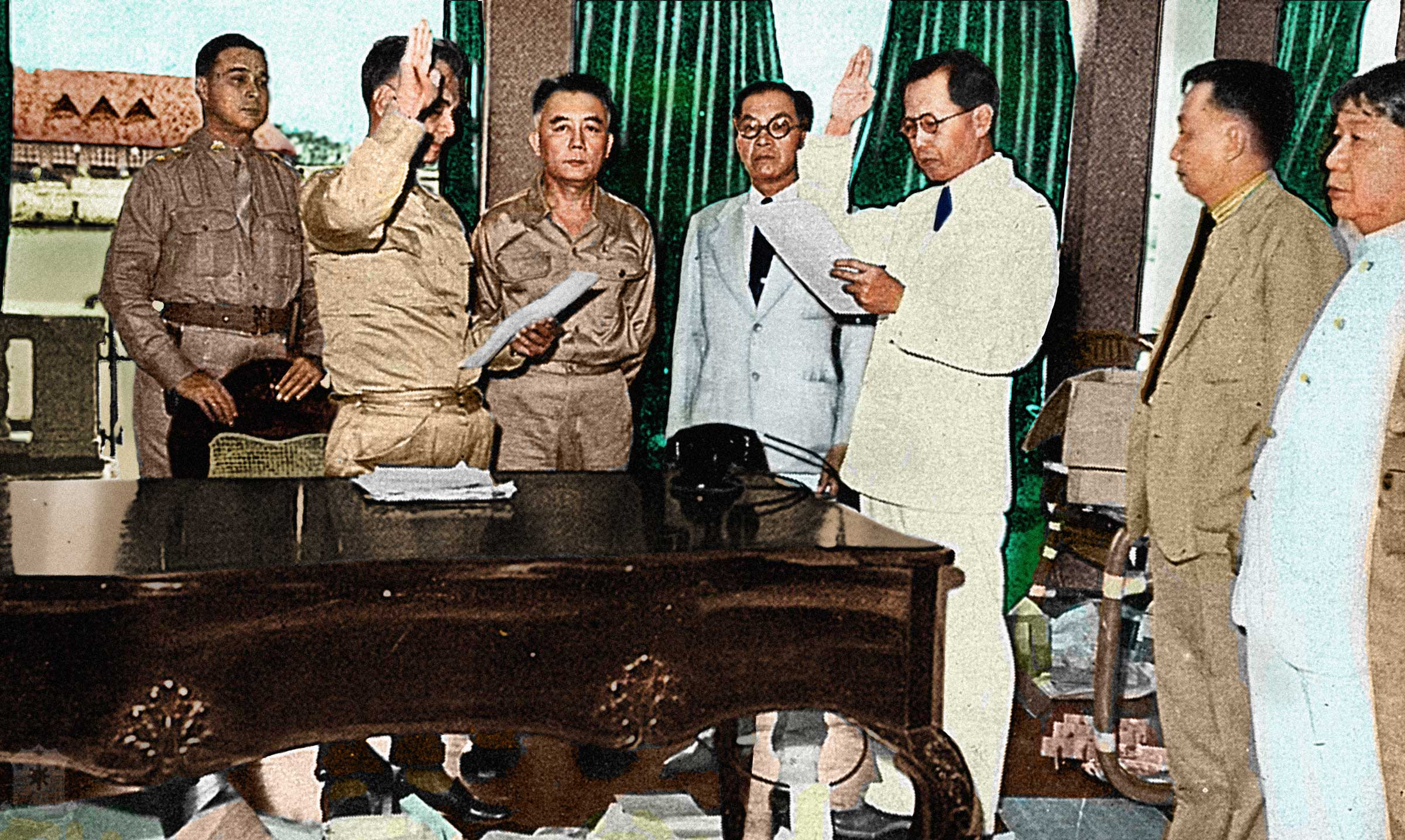
José Abad Santos in 1941

With the Japanese invasion rapidly advancing to the southern part of the Philippines, President Manuel L. Quezon was advised by General Douglas MacArthur to establish a government in exile to the United States; Quezon invited Chief Justice Abad Santos to leave with him. The latter declined preferring to remain in the Philippines and carry on his work and stay with his family. On March 17, 1942, the day of Quezon's departure at Zamboanguita, Negros Oriental for the United States by way of Australia, he appointed Abad Santos as the acting president with full authority to act in the name of, and on behalf of the president of the Commonwealth of the Philippines and become the acting commander-in-chief of the Armed Forces of the Philippines in some areas unoccupied by the Japanese.

=== Death ===
On April 11, 1942, Abad Santos, his son José Jr. (nicknamed Pepito), Col. Benito Valeriano and two enlisted men were captured by the Japanese in Barangay Tubod in Barili, Cebu while traveling by automobile to Toledo, Cebu. He identified himself as the chief justice of the Supreme Court of the Philippines. He and his son were then taken to a concentration camp in Basak San Nicolas, Cebu City. When asked to cooperate with the Japanese, he refused. Although he had nothing to do with military operations, they imputed to him, as acting president, the destruction of the bridges and other public works in Cebu that had been undertaken by the USAFFE forces to delay the invasion of the island.

The Japanese high commander, Kiyotake Kawaguchi, took him and his son aboard a ship on April 26, 1942, thinking they were heading to Manila. Instead, they arrived on April 28 at Parang, Cotabato (now in Maguindanao del Norte). The next day they were brought to Malabang, Lanao, arriving on April 30. After two days' confinement at Japanese camps, Abad Santos was called in front of Kawaguchi and was informed about the order of his execution. Before he was shot to death, he was able to talk to his son Pepito. Among his last parting words to his son were, "Do not cry, Pepito, show to these people that you are brave. It is an honor to die for one's country. Not everybody has that chance." Abad Santos was executed at 2:00 pm, on May 1, 1942, under a tall coconut tree near a river bank. He refused to be blindfolded and refused the last cigarette offered to him.

=== Burial site ===
Prior to 2014, the public knew Abad Santos was executed either on the dates May 2 or May 7, 1942. But the National Historical Commission of the Philippines (NHCP) ascertained May 1, 1942 using the Japanese war crime records found in the National Archives of the Philippines.

Later that afternoon of May 1, 1942, two Japanese interpreters took José's son, Pepito, to his father's grave. It was a small mound—too small, Pepito thought, to hold his father's remains if properly buried. On top of the grave lay a rock as large as a coconut. Pepito begged that he be allowed to mark the grave with a cross, but his request was denied.

After the war, an intensive search for the place where José was buried failed. Pepito did not find the hut and the trees, which would have served as points of reference for locating the grave. The area where the execution took place had been plowed and had root crops planted in its place.

== Personal life ==
On September 21, 1918, Abad Santos was married to Amanda Teopaco daughter of Pedro Teopaco member of the Malolos Congress and has five children José Jr. (born 1919), Luz (born 1920), Amanda (born 1921), Osmundo (born 1922) and Victoria (born 1924). A staunch Methodist, Abad Santos worshiped at Central United Methodist Church along T.M. Kalaw Street in Ermita, Manila (then known as the Central Methodist Episcopal Church). Abad Santos was a freemason and a member of the Upsilon Sigma Phi fraternity.

== Commemoration and legacy ==
- On 1945, one of the six campuses of Arellano University was built in Pasay City and its name is derived by his name.
- When the Philippine Women's University established its primary and secondary education divisions in 1949, they named the school as Jose Abad Santos Memorial School in honor of Abad Santos who was a former chairman of the board of trustees of the university.
- The Municipality of Trinidad in the then-undivided Davao province, created in 1948, was renamed as the Municipality of Jose Abad Santos in his honor in 1955. The municipality was later included in Davao del Sur in 1967 and in Davao Occidental in 2013.
- Abad Santos Avenue, a city street in Tondo, Manila, was renamed in his honor in 1955.
- The Abad Santos station of LRT-1, near Abad Santos Avenue in Tondo that opened in 1985, is named after him.
- Starting in 1991, he is commemorated on the ₱1,000 banknote of the Philippines together with Brigadier General Vicente Lim and founder of the Girl Scouts of the Philippines Josefa Llanes Escoda, who were all killed by the Imperial Japanese Army during the Second World War.
- In 1992, Republic Act No. 7552 was enacted declaring May 7 of every year as "Jose Abad Santos Day", a special non-working holiday in the province of Pampanga.
- Jose Abad Santos Avenue, a major highway in Central Luzon, was renamed in his honor in 2007.
- On 2018, Philippine World War II Memorial Foundation launched a book entitled Honor: The Legacy of Jose Abad Santos.
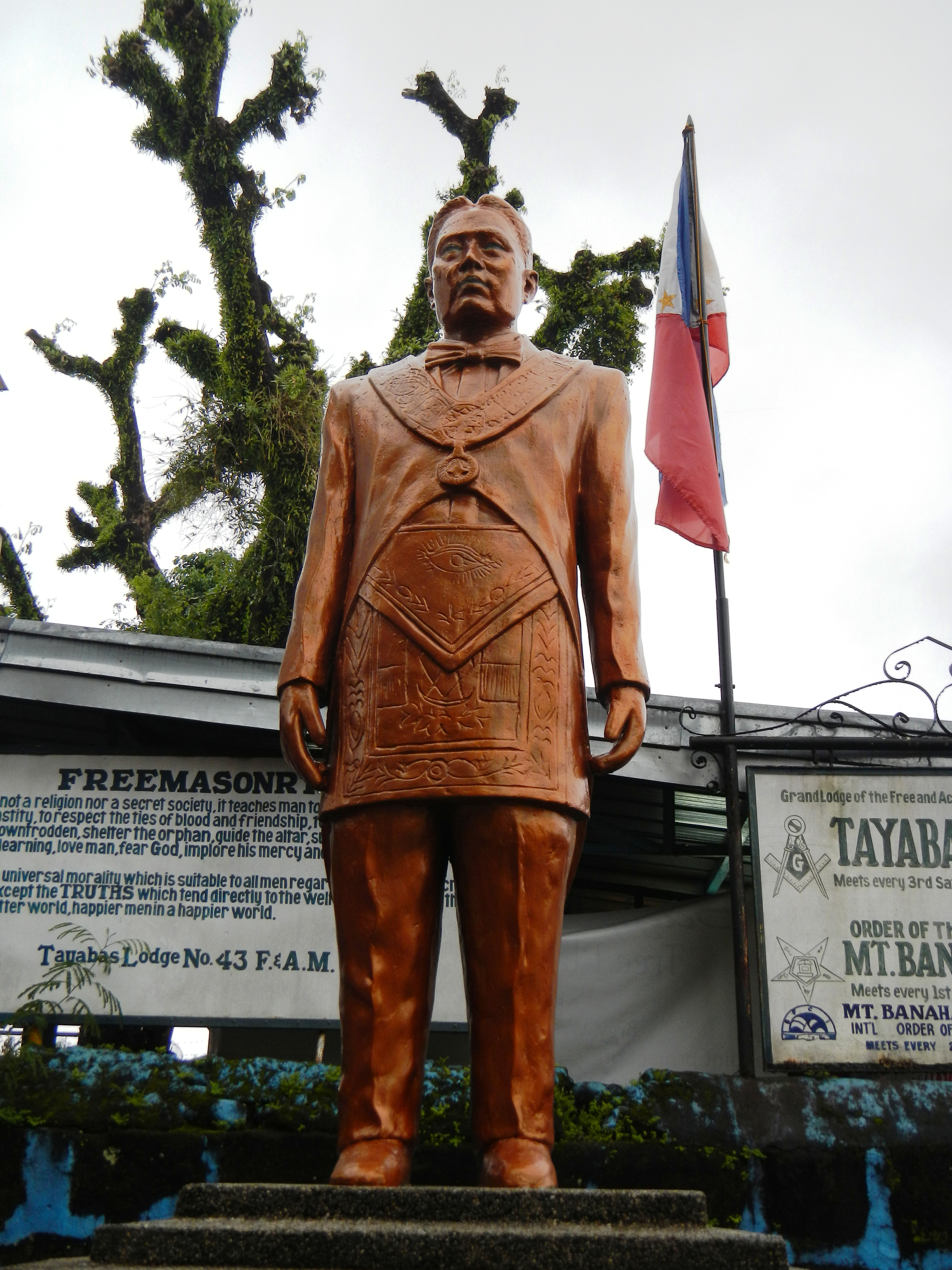
Abad Santos Monument in Tayabas City

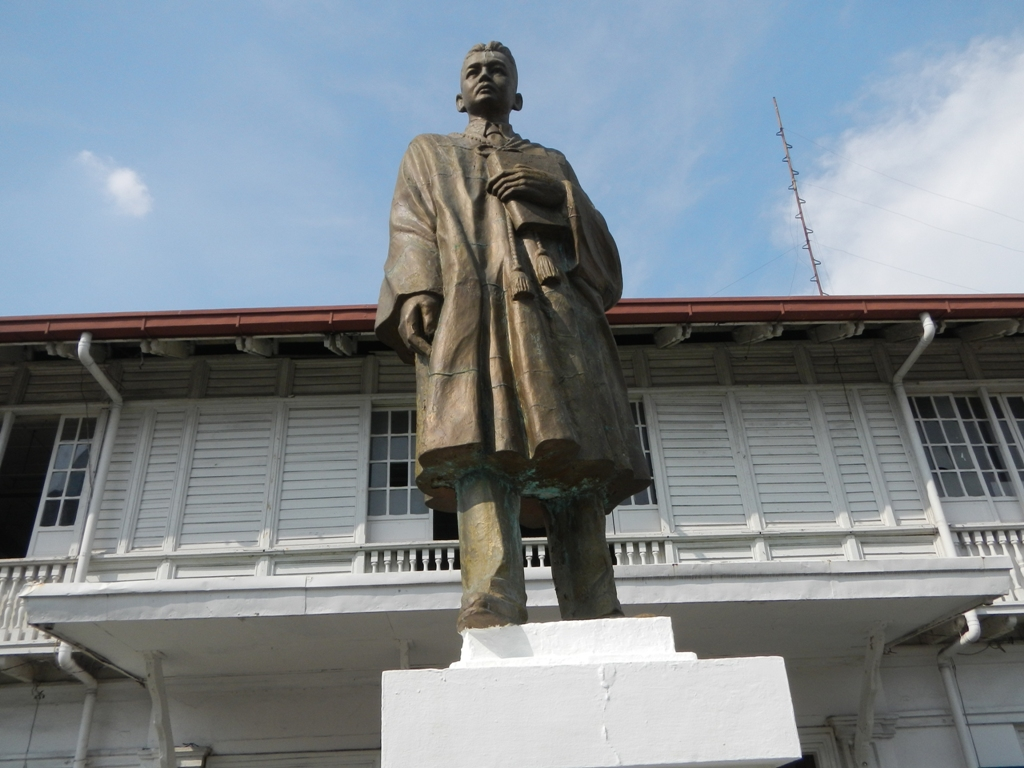
Abad Santos Monument at Museo ning Angeles, Pampanga

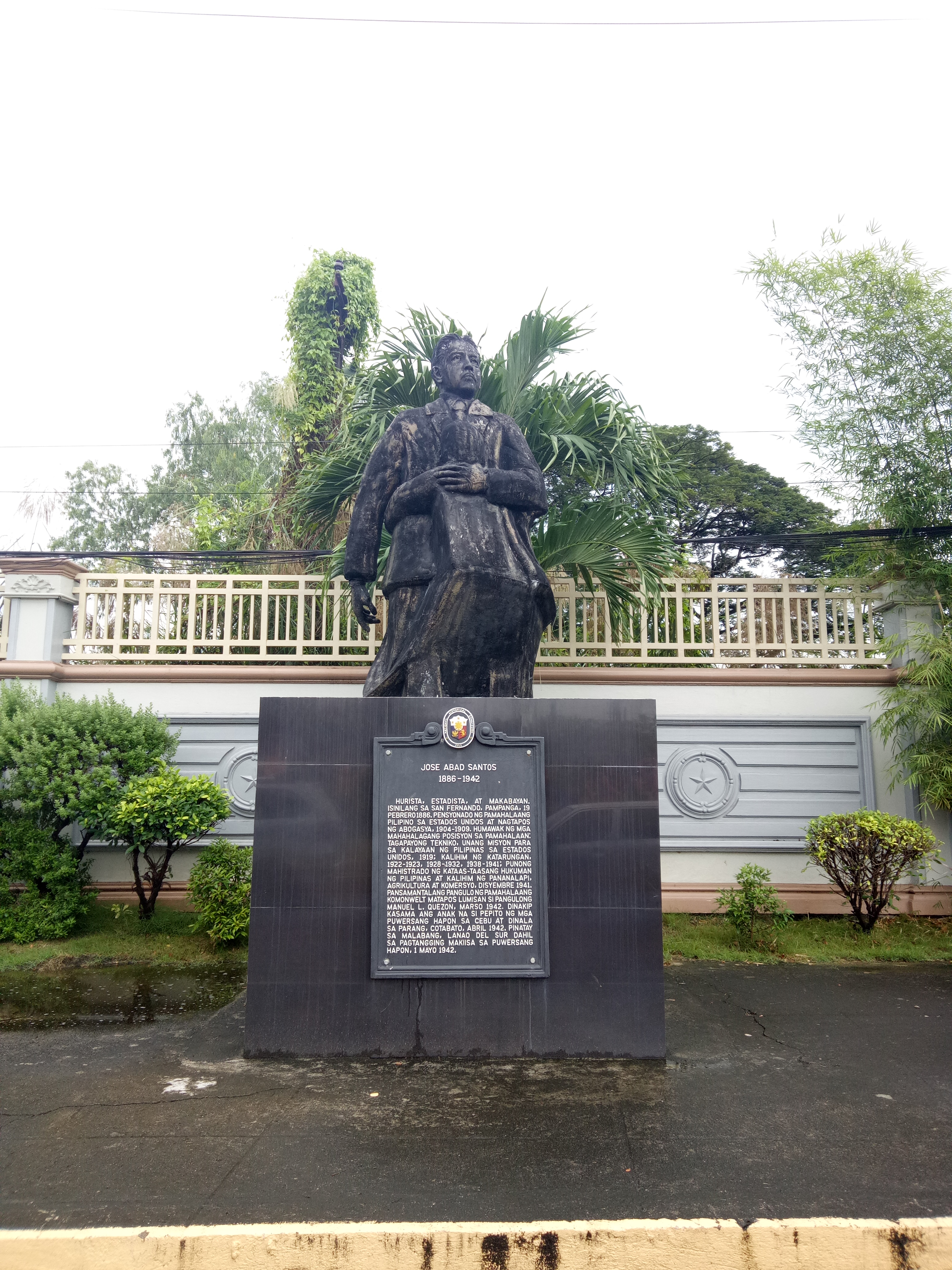
Abad Santos Monument at Heroes Hall, San Fernando, Pampanga

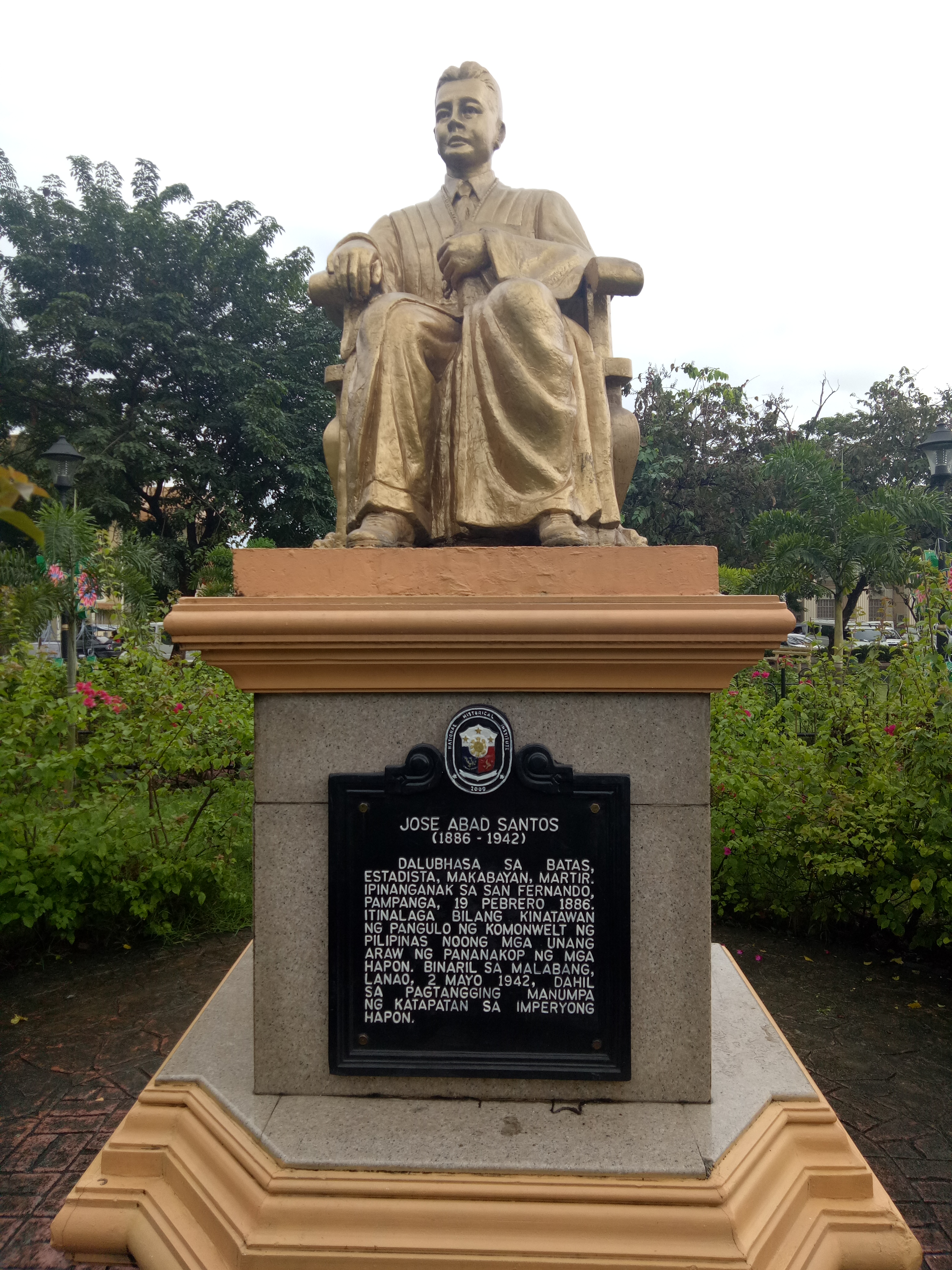
Abad Santos Monument at Pampanga Provincial Capitol

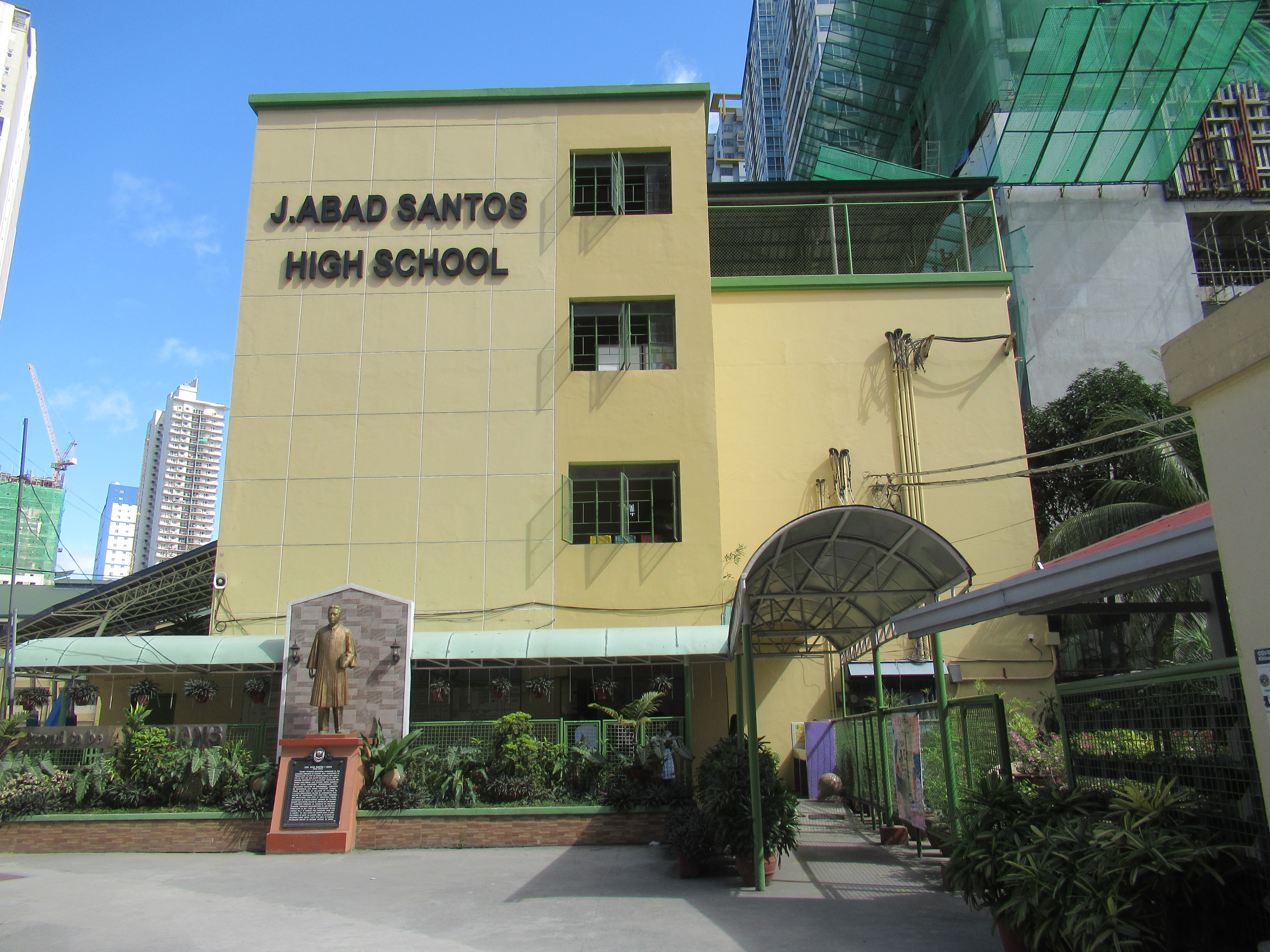
Jose Abad Santos High School with the Abad Santos Monument in San Nicolas, Manila

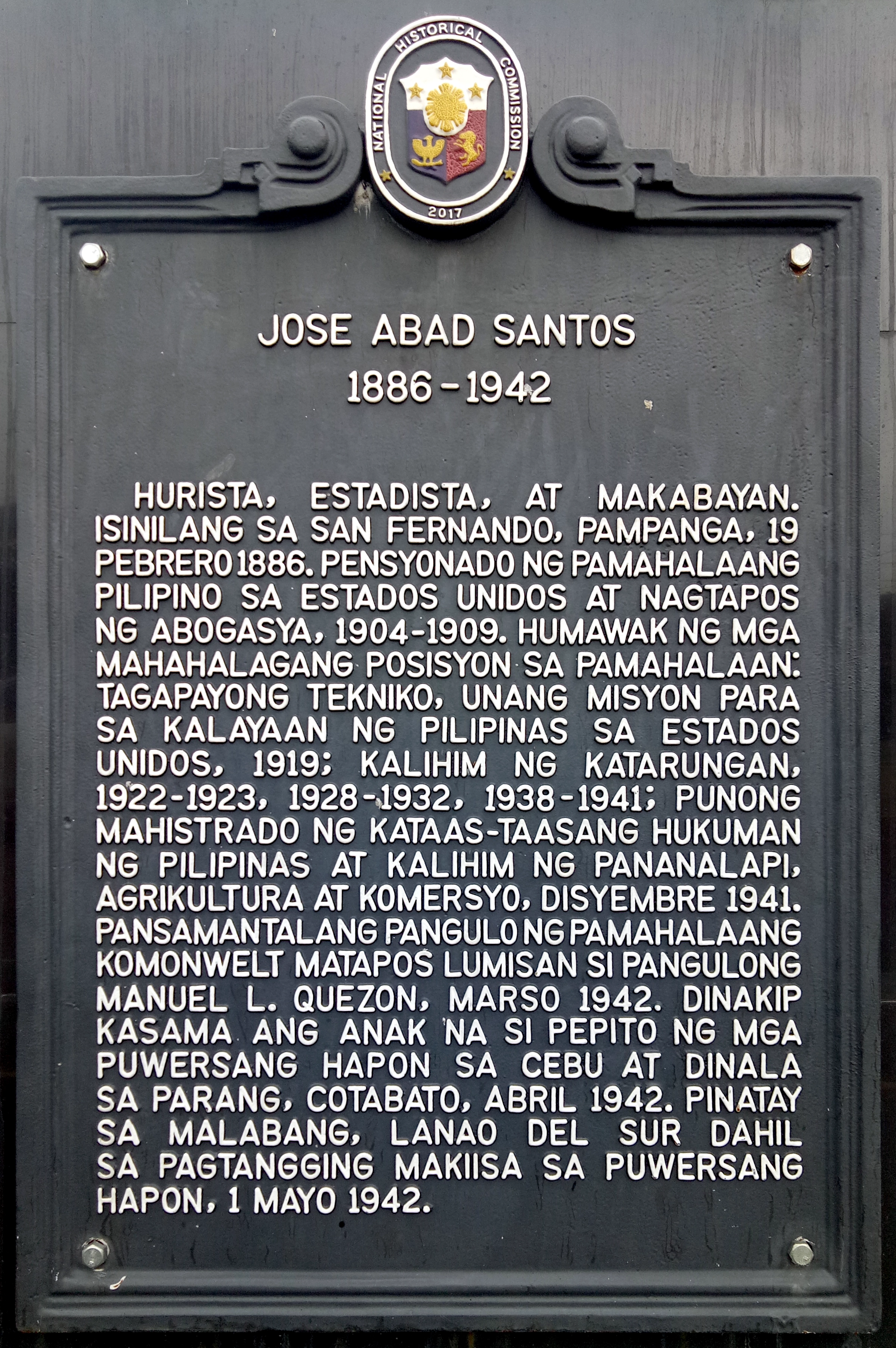
2017 historical marker in San Fernando

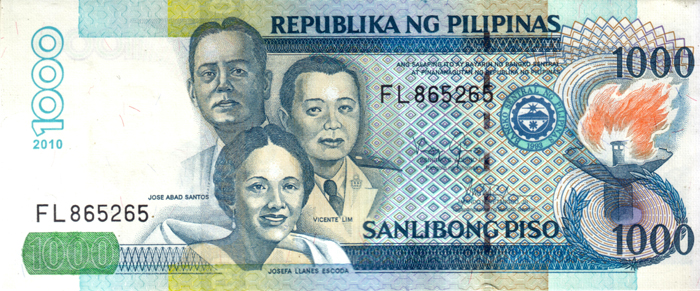
1000 Philippine peso bill (New Design Series)

== In popular culture ==
- Portrayed by Lito Legaspi in the 1998 series Bayani in the episode Jose Abad Santos
- Portrayed by Alex Medina and Ricardo Cepeda in the 2018 documentary-film, Honor: The Legacy of Jose Abad Santos

Legal offices
Preceded by Ramón Avanceña	Chief Justice of the Supreme Court of the Philippines; 1941–1942	Succeeded by José Yulo
Preceded by Norberto Romuáldez	Associate Justice of the Supreme Court of the Philippines; 1932–1941	Succeeded by Ricardo Paras
Government offices
Preceded by Quintin Paredes	Secretary of Justice; 1922–1923	Succeeded by Luis P. Torres
Preceded by Luis P. Torres	Secretary of Justice; 1928–1932	Succeeded by Alexander Reyes
Preceded by José Yulo	Secretary of Justice; 1938–1941	Succeeded by Teófilo Sison
Preceded by Serafin Marabut	Secretary of Finance; 1941–1942	Succeeded by Andrés Soriano as Secretary of Finance, Agriculture, and Commerce
