= Congressional canvass for the 1953 Philippine presidential election =

The following is the official canvassing of votes by the Congress of the Philippines for the 1953 Philippine presidential election.

== Presidential election ==
Candidate	Party	Votes	%
Ramon Magsaysay	Nacionalista Party	2,912,992	68.90
Elpidio Quirino	Liberal Party	1,313,991	31.08
Gaudencio Bueno	Independent	736	0.02
Total		4,227,719	100.00
Valid votes		4,227,719	97.71
Invalid/blank votes		98,987	2.29
Total votes		4,326,706	100.00
Registered voters/turnout		5,603,231	77.22
Source: Nohlen, Grotz, Hartmann, Hasall and Santos

Province/City	Magsaysay	Quirino	Bueno
Abra	7,315	16,672	9
Agusan	20,273	7,153	1
Albay	49,826	13,031	2
Antique	25,189	10,940	59
Bacolod	14,656	5,565	0
Baguio	5,251	4,467	0
Basilan	6,138	1,944	0
Bataan	30,166	3,906	1
Batanes	1,630	1,400	0
Batangas	105,050	13,395	159
Bohol	68,879	37,849	6
Bukidnon	11,795	2,252	0
Bulacan	97,816	42,857	1
Butuan	11,801	3,859	0
Cabanatuan	9,098	3,954	0
Cagayan	37,848	24,595	0
Cagayan de Oro	7,754	1,442	0
Calbayog	5,176	6,307	0
Camarines Norte	23,662	8,990	2
Camarines Sur	62,155	32,749	3
Capiz	48,958	35,118	0
Catanduanes	18,793	5,680	0
Cavite	35,363	25,061	6
Cavite City	7,395	2,330	0
Cebu	101,010	62,389	2
Cebu City	31,317	8,813	0
Cotabato	60,085	22,489	5
Dagupan	8,401	5,514	0
Dansalan	2,800	3,237	0
Davao	46,021	12,495	0
Davao City	25,424	6,323	22
Dumaguete	5,084	1,339	1
Iligan	5,698	2,277	0
Ilocos Norte	25,082	34,162	4
Ilocos Sur	17,689	57,051	0
Iloilo	146,560	31,993	3
Iloilo City	24,866	5,736	0
Isabela	35,094	24,100	2
La Union	14,108	42,267	2
Laguna	73,816	14,155	64
Lanao	39,980	37,450	60
Legazpi	10,020	4,790	0
Leyte	101,900	55,646	2
Lipa	11,304	2,185	4
Manila	180,328	43,953	34
Marinduque	17,019	2,675	0
Masbate	27,622	11,375	4
Misamis Occidental	23,600	9,612	0
Misamis Oriental	34,297	9,171	0
Mountain Province	35,488	15,688	6
Naga	6,104	1,894	1
Negros Occidental	88,257	35,115	1
Negros Oriental	36,718	21,594	1
Nueva Ecija	58,945	41,283	6
Nueva Vizcaya	13,206	8,277	1
Occidental Mindoro	9,462	4,574	0
Oriental Mindoro	29,843	5,219	0
Ormoc	4,057	5,778	0
Ozamiz	6,417	1,810	0
Palawan	13,438	8,047	1
Pampanga	86,623	19,682	2
Pangasinan	121,948	98,395	8
Pasay	18,776	7,958	12
Quezon	97,398	13,567	21
Quezon City	32,110	12,564	9
Rizal	135,349	30,965	191
Romblon	12,016	8,833	0
Roxas	4,624	4,480	0
Samar	67,364	39,017	2
San Pablo	12,075	3,359	7
Sorsogon	40,273	21,399	2
Sulu	11,523	9,359	2
Surigao	37,638	18,653	1
Tacloban	6,979	3,316	0
Tagaytay	602	48	0
Tarlac	55,966	27,428	3
Zambales	39,015	1,924	1
Zamboanga City	11,480	3,762	0
Zamboanga del Norte	19,526	9,257	0
Zamboanga del Sur	18,660	8,033	0
Total	2,912,992	1,313,991	736
Province/City			
Province/City	Magsaysay	Quirino	Bueno

== Vice presidential election ==
Candidate	Party	Votes	%
Carlos P. Garcia	Nacionalista Party	2,515,265	62.90
José Yulo	Liberal Party	1,483,802	37.10
Total		3,999,067	100.00
Valid votes		3,999,067	92.43
Invalid/blank votes		327,639	7.57
Total votes		4,326,706	100.00
Registered voters/turnout		5,603,231	77.22
Source: Nohlen, Grotz, Hartmann, Hasall and Santos

Province/City	Garcia	Yulo
Abra	6,102	17,054
Agusan	19,292	7,058
Albay	38,139	19,847
Antique	19,148	15,966
Bacolod	11,880	7,906
Baguio	4,296	5,239
Basilan	5,502	2,096
Bataan	23,824	5,848
Batanes	1,053	1,624
Batangas	90,534	14,790
Bohol	73,384	32,481
Bukidnon	10,966	2,605
Bulacan	83,585	46,035
Butuan	11,165	4,081
Cabanatuan	8,779	3,796
Cagayan	32,455	26,939
Cagayan de Oro	7,709	1,326
Calbayog	4,895	6,341
Camarines Norte	20,645	10,712
Camarines Sur	54,074	36,368
Capiz	38,246	42,857
Catanduanes	16,842	6,689
Cavite	29,566	25,797
Cavite City	6,379	2,887
Cebu	96,413	60,964
Cebu City	30,200	9,042
Cotabato	38,444	35,226
Dagupan	7,896	5,804
Dansalan	2,347	2,688
Davao	45,878	10,905
Davao City	25,318	5,745
Dumaguete	4,583	1,691
Iligan	5,697	2,090
Ilocos Norte	21,149	30,668
Ilocos Sur	15,712	56,430
Iloilo	100,988	69,503
Iloilo City	20,064	9,768
Isabela	27,747	28,753
La Union	11,694	43,409
Laguna	58,344	22,559
Lanao	32,961	28,410
Legazpi	8,815	5,362
Leyte	96,920	54,610
Lipa	10,058	1,575
Manila	162,856	58,825
Marinduque	15,480	2,786
Masbate	19,733	15,289
Misamis Occidental	25,213	7,283
Misamis Oriental	34,627	6,610
Mountain Province	23,575	21,317
Naga	5,302	2,372
Negros Occidental	70,748	47,483
Negros Oriental	33,111	23,435
Nueva Ecija	59,910	41,406
Nueva Vizcaya	11,604	9,389
Occidental Mindoro	7,109	5,745
Oriental Mindoro	24,924	6,247
Ormoc	3,555	6,014
Ozamiz	6,419	1,615
Palawan	12,250	8,630
Pampanga	69,778	25,651
Pangasinan	109,887	105,756
Pasay	18,508	8,797
Quezon	79,349	22,805
Quezon City	28,831	14,979
Rizal	118,409	39,375
Romblon	10,873	9,390
Roxas	3,653	5,164
Samar	58,772	41,938
San Pablo	10,267	3,524
Sorsogon	34,223	24,044
Sulu	7,373	7,885
Surigao	38,868	15,789
Tacloban	6,470	3,547
Tagaytay	558	47
Tarlac	45,247	31,039
Zambales	34,435	3,729
Zamboanga City	11,001	3,802
Zamboanga del Norte	19,452	8,353
Zamboanga del Sur	19,207	6,388
Total	2,515,265	1,483,802
Province/City		
Province/City	Garcia	Yulo
