= People of the Philippines v. Hernandez =

Philippine supreme court case

People of the Philippines v Hernandez et al.
- Court: Regional Trial Court

Full case name
- People of the Philippines v. Amado Hernandez et al.
- People of the Philippines v. Bayani Espiritu, Teopista Valerio (G.R. L-6026)
- Decided: May 30, 1960
- Citation: 99 Phil. Rep 515 (1956); G.R No. L-6025 et al.
- Argument: Oral argument

Outcome
- Found guilty of the crime of conspiracy to commit rebellion, as defined and punished in Article 136 of the Revised Penal Code Sentenced to suffer imprisonment for five years, four months and twenty-one days of prision correccional, and to pay a fine of P5,000.00

Court membership
- Chief Justice: Ricardo Paras
- Majority: Banzon, Bautista Angelo, Conception, Reyes
- Concurrence: Paredes, Dizon, Macalintal
- Dissent: Padilla, Barrera, Regala

Laws applied
- Revised Penal Code

People of the Philippines v. Hernandez, 99 Phil. Rep 515 (1956), was a case decided by the Philippine Supreme Court which held that the crime of rebellion under the Revised Penal Code of the Philippines is charged as a single offense, and that it cannot be made into a complex crime. While it was decided on an almost divided opinion, it nevertheless became a stable doctrine in Philippine jurisprudence.

== Facts ==
It was the height of the Government action against communists and the Hukbalahap guerillas. President Elpidio Quirino, through his Defense Secretary (and later, President) Ramon Magsaysay intensified the campaign against them, and the crackdown was on against communist organizations. Due to such government action, several communist leaders like Luis Taruc and the Lava brothers were soon in government custody.

On January 20, 1951, the Congress of Labor Organizations (CLO) headquarters was raided. Writer (and future National Artist for Literature) Amado V. Hernandez, himself a labor leader, was arrested on January 26 for various rebellious activities with the CLO. Upon his arrest, he was charged in the criminal information of “Rebellion with Murder, Arson and Robbery”. Five years after his arrest, Hernandez asked for bail with the court where his case was pending, but was denied on the basis of the nature of the offense (if the crime was complexed, the penalty for the most serious crime shall be imposed). Thus, he filed a petition to the Supreme Court.

== Arguments ==
The government, headed by Solicitor General Ambrosio Padilla, argued that the gravity of the crime committed required the denial of the bail. Moreover, the complex crime charged by the government against Hernandez has been successfully imposed with other arrested communist leaders and was sentenced to life imprisonment.

== Decision ==
The Supreme Court, through then Associate Justice Roberto Concepcion, ruled that rebellion cannot be complexed with other crimes, such as murder and arson. Rebellion in itself would include and absorb the said crimes, thus granting the accused his right to bail. Murder and arson are crimes inherent and concomitant when rebellion is taking place. Rebellion in the Revised Penal Code constitutes one single crime and that there is no reason to complex it with other crimes. As basis, the Court cited several cases convicting the defendants of simple rebellion although they killed several persons.

Thus, the petition for bail was granted. On May 30, 1964, the Supreme Court acquitted Hernandez (People v. Hernandez (1964)).

== Legacy ==
The Court was divided upon the decision, having a vote of 6-4 (one justice died a month before its promulgation). But it was later on accepted as valuable jurisprudence, starting with the subsequent case of People of the Philippines v. Geronimo (100 Phil. Reports 90). The case is now a standard case study in Philippine law schools.

According to Justice J.B.L. Reyes, during the deliberations of the Hernandez case, Justice Sabino Padilla (who is the brother of the Solicitor General, Ambrosio Padilla) openly accused Chief Justice Ricardo Paras for being prejudiced against the Government and asking biased questions during the oral argument. Riled, Paras rebutted, and a heated exchange soon ensued between the Chief Justice and Padilla, which would have worsened had not they restrained themselves.

As of 1990, the Philippine Supreme Court again revisited the doctrine in Hernandez, where Juan Ponce Enrile was similarly charged with the same offense as Hernandez. The Supreme Court upheld anew the Hernandez decision (Enrile v. Salazar (1990)), maintaining that it is still good law and applicable.

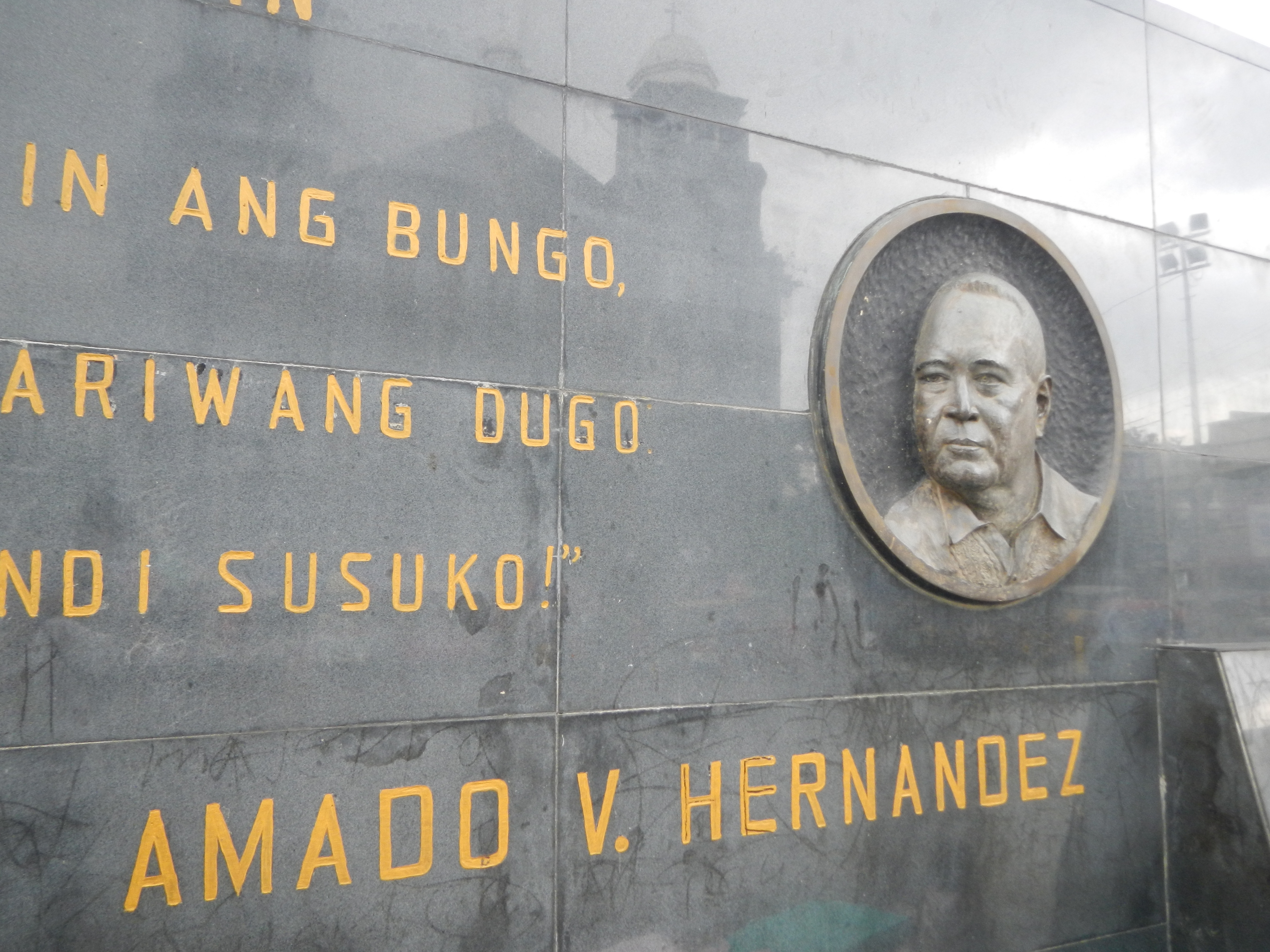
Amado V. Hernandez Monument-Memorial (Tondo, Manila)

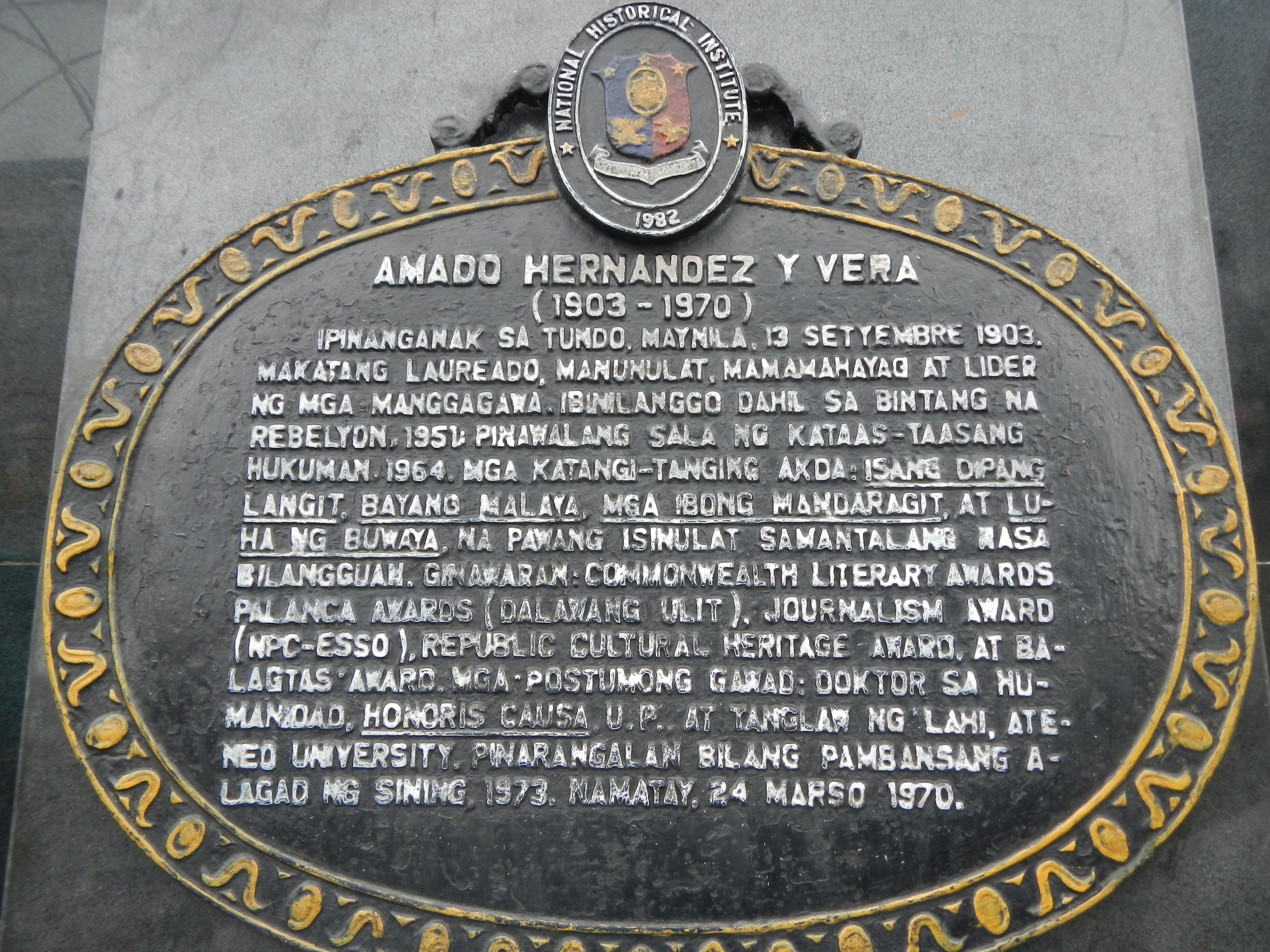
NHI Marker (in front of Santo Niño de Tondo Parish)

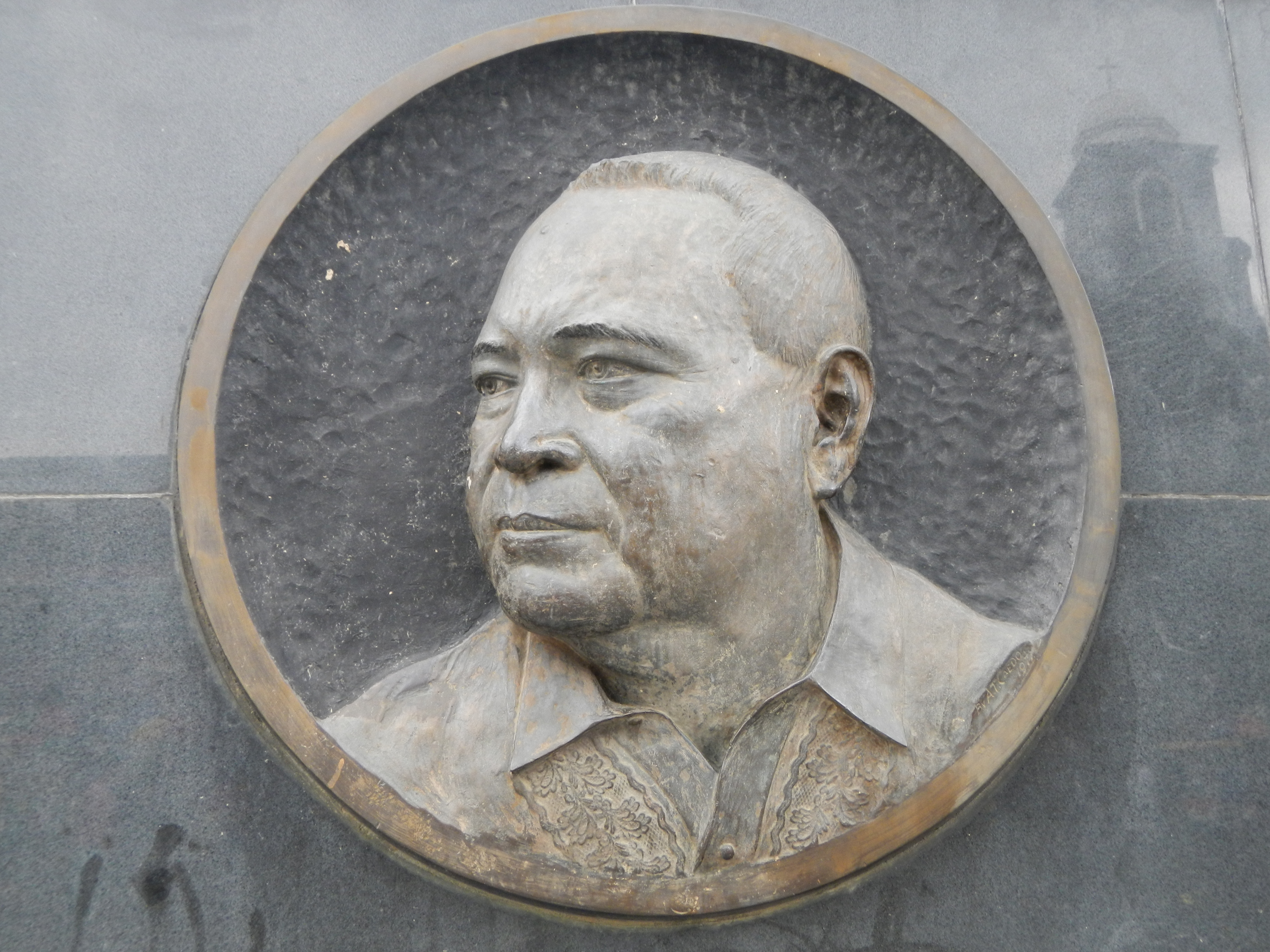
Sculpture of Hernandez

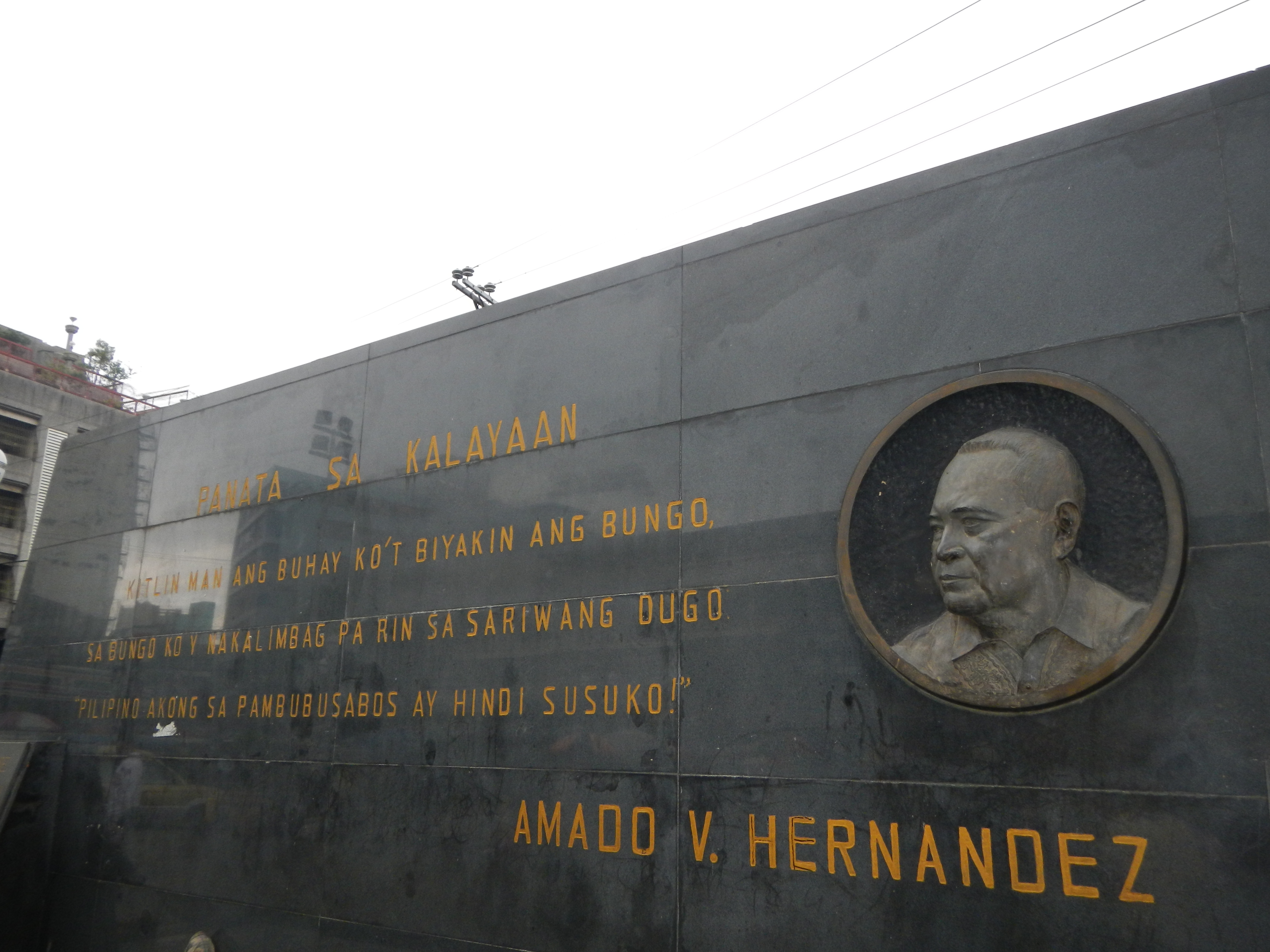
Facade
