= Ramón Avanceña =

Chief Justice of the Philippines from 1925 to 1941

The Honorable Ramón Avanceña
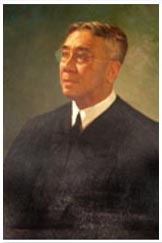
- Official portrait

4th Chief Justice of the Philippines
- In office April 1, 1925 – December 5, 1941
- Appointed by: Calvin Coolidge
- Preceded by: Manuel Araullo
- Succeeded by: José Abad Santos

Attorney General of the Philippines
- In office July 1, 1914 – March 1, 1917
- Preceded by: Ignacio Villamor
- Succeeded by: Quintín Paredes

18th Associate Justice of the Philippine Supreme Court
- In office October 31, 1917 – March 31, 1925
- Appointed by: Woodrow Wilson
- Preceded by: Seat established
- Succeeded by: Carlos Imperial

Vice President of the Philippines
- De facto
- In office October 14, 1943 – January 15, 1944
- President: Jose P. Laurel
- Succeeded by: Benigno Aquino Sr. (de facto)
- Preceded by: Elpidio Quirino
- Succeeded by: Fernando Lopez

Personal details
- Born: Ramón Avanceña y Quiosay; April 13, 1872 Molo, Iloilo, Captaincy General of the Philippines, Spanish East Indies
- Died: June 12, 1957 (aged 85) Pasay, Rizal, Philippines
- Resting place: Manila Memorial Park – Sucat
- Party: Independent
- Spouse: Maria Flocerfina Abad
- Relations: Amando Avanceña (brother)
- Children: 6
- Education: Colegio de San Juan de Letran (BA); University of Santo Tomas (LLB)
- Occupation: Lawyer

Ramón Avanceña y Quiosay (April 13, 1872 – June 12, 1957) was a Chief Justice of the Supreme Court of the Philippines. He served from 1925 to 1941, when he resigned at the beginning of the Japanese occupation of the Philippines during World War II. He was from Arevalo, Iloilo City.

== Early life and education ==
Avanceña was born on April 13, 1872 to Lucas Avanceña and Petra Quiosay in Molo, Iloilo City, but grew up in Arevalo, Iloilo City.

He earned his Bachelor of Arts at Colegio de San Juan de Letran and Bachelor of Laws at University of Santo Tomas.

== Legal career ==
Ramón Avanceña served as a legal adviser to the Federal State of the Visayas, the revolutionary government of provinces of Iloilo, Capiz and Antique, and was chosen to negotiate with the American forces on Panay during the Philippine–American War.

During the American Colonial Era, he was appointed as assistant attorney in the Bureau of Justice. In 1905, he was appointed auxiliary judge. He was Attorney General of the Philippines from 1914 until 1917, when he was appointed to the Supreme Court as an Associate Justice. Upon the death of Manuel Araullo in 1924, he succeeded as Chief Justice, but he had to wait until 1925 to be formally appointed.

He was supposed to join Philippine Commonwealth President Manuel L. Quezon in exile during the onset of the Japanese Occupation, but worried that he would not be together with his family, so he decided to stay put.

== Personal life ==
His sons José, Alberto, and Jesús became practicing attorneys.

The Ramon Avanceña National High School in Arevalo, Iloilo City and Ramon Avanceña High School in Quiapo, Manila are named after him.

Legal offices
Preceded by Ignacio Villamor	Attorney General of the Philippines; 1914–1917	Succeeded by Quintín Paredes
New seat	Associate Justice of the Supreme Court of the Philippines; 1917–1925	Succeeded by Carlos Imperial
Preceded by Manuel Araullo	Chief Justice of the Supreme Court of the Philippines; 1924–1941	Succeeded by José Abad Santos
