= Manuel Moran =

Chief Justice of the Philippines from 1945 to 1951

The Honourable Manuel V. Moran
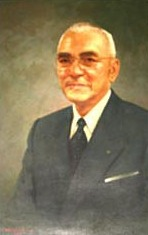
- Official portrait

7th Chief Justice of the Philippines
- In office July 9, 1945 – March 20, 1951
- Appointed by: Sergio Osmeña
- Preceded by: José Yulo
- Succeeded by: Ricardo Paras

36th Associate Justice of the Supreme Court of the Philippines
- In office December 12, 1938 – July 9, 1945
- Appointed by: Manuel Quezon
- Preceded by: Claro M. Recto
- Succeeded by: Mariano H. de Joya

Personal details
- Born: Manuel Vicente Moran y Palisoc; October 27, 1893 Binalonan, Pangasinan, Captaincy General of the Philippines
- Died: August 23, 1961 (aged 67) Manila, Philippines
- Spouse: Nieves Gonzalez de Moran
- Education: Escuela de Manila

Manuel Vicente Moran y Palisóc (October 27, 1893 – August 23, 1961), more commonly known as Manuel V. Moran, was the Chief Justice of the Supreme Court of the Philippines from July 9, 1945, until March 20, 1951.

== Career ==
Moran graduated from his Bachelor of Laws degree at Escuela de Manila and was admitted to the bar in 1913.

He started out as an auxiliary judge of Iloilo and Pampanga before being promoted as a full judge, and later, an Associate Justice of the Court of Appeals. He was appointed as Supreme Court Associate Justice in 1938 then elevated to the post as Chief Justice in July 1945.

After leaving office, he became the first Philippine Ambassador to Spain and the Holy See. Hoping to be appointed again to the Supreme Court, he was extended an ad interim appointment of outgoing president Elpidio Quirino in 1953, but Moran backed out, for he felt that President-elect Ramon Magsaysay would fill such vacancy. His reinstatement never materialized.

Legal offices
Preceded by Claro M. Recto	Associate Justice of the Supreme Court of the Philippines; 1938–1945	Succeeded by Cesar Bengzon
Preceded by Jose Yulo	Chief Justice of the Supreme Court of the Philippines; 1945–1951	Succeeded by Ricardo Paras
