= Manuel Araullo =

Chief Justice of the Philippines from 1921 to 1924

The Honourable Manuel Araullo
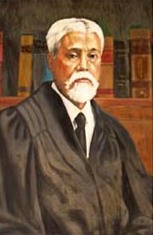
- Official portrait

3rd Chief Justice of the Philippines
- In office November 1, 1921 – July 26, 1924
- Appointed by: Warren G. Harding
- Preceded by: Victorino Mapa
- Succeeded by: Ramon Avanceña

15th Associate Justice of the Supreme Court of the Philippines
- In office December 16, 1913 – October 31, 1921
- Appointed by: Woodrow Wilson
- Preceded by: Victorino Mapa
- Succeeded by: Norberto Romualdez

Personal details
- Born: Manuel Araullo y Gonzáles; 1 January 1853 Balayan, Batangas, Captaincy General of the Philippines
- Died: 26 July 1924 (aged 71) Manila, Philippine Islands
- Resting place: San Agustin Church, Intramuros, Manila, Philippines

Manuel Araullo y Gonzáles (1 January 1853 – 26 July 1924) was the third Chief Justice of the Supreme Court of the Philippines. He served from November 1, 1921 until his death on July 26, 1924.

== Education ==
Araullo received his early education at the Ateneo Municipal de Manila and subsequently pursued his secondary education at the Colegio de San Juan de Letran, where he earned a bachelor's degree in philosophy. Afterward, he spent a year studying theology before transitioning to the field of law. In 1876, he graduated with a Bachelor of Laws from the University of Santo Tomas, where he later served as a professor. He passed the bar in 1876.

== Legal career ==
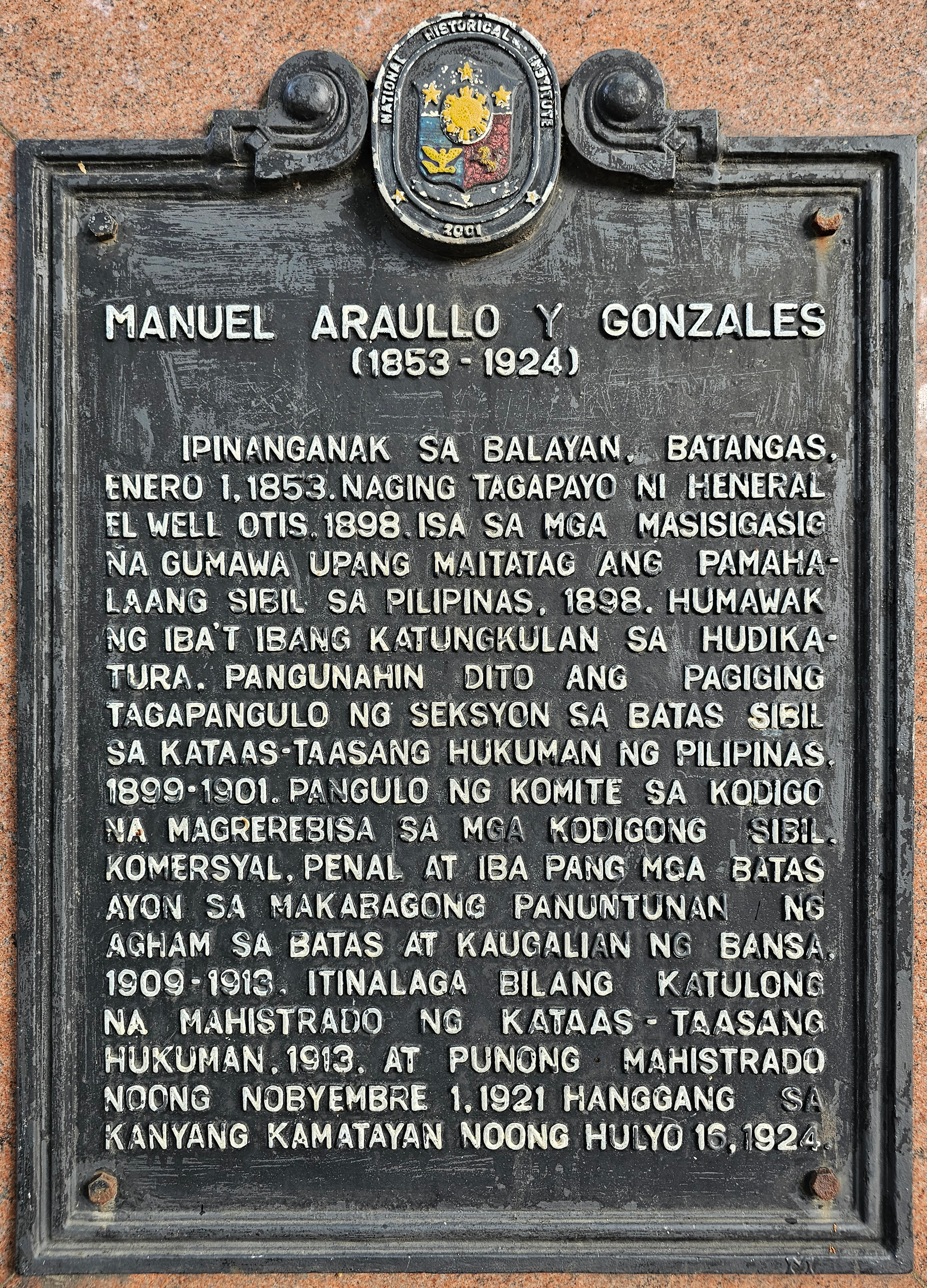
Historical marker installed in 2001 inside the Araullo High School in Manila

Shortly after earning his law degree, Araullo established his own law practice. However, driven by a desire to broaden his knowledge, he embarked on a journey to Spain in March 1877, where he continued to practice law. In July 1878, he ventured to the major cities of France and England before eventually returning to Spain. It was in December 1878 that he received the title of Doctor of Laws from the Universidad Central de Madrid.

In April 1879, Araullo returned to the Philippines to assume the position of rapporteur (relator) of the Real Audiencia of Manila. He held this position for ten consecutive years. During those ten years, he also served temporarily, on several occasions, as Secretario de Gobierno and deputy assistant public prosecutor (abogado fiscal) of the said Audiencia of Manila. He resigned in April 1890 to take on another position, this time as abogado fiscal of the Audiencia Territorial de Cebu. He served until his resignation in mid-1891. He returned to Manila where he opened a law office and in 1892, he became a professor of commercial law and public finance at the University of Santo Tomas.

In 1899, at the outset of the American occupation, Araullo was designated as the president of the civil branch within the newly reinstated Supreme Court of the Philippine Islands. He served in this capacity for two years before being reassigned as a judge of the Court of First Instance in the 4th Judicial District, covering Tarlac, Pampanga, and Nueva Ecija. In 1903, he returned to Manila to be a judge in the Court of First Instance there.

In 1910, Araullo assumed the role of president of the Code Committee, which had been established a year earlier for the purpose of revising and amending the existing civil, commercial, penal, and procedural codes in the country, as well as preparing new codes on said subjects.

In 1913, Araullo assumed the position of Associate Justice of the Supreme Court, filling the seat that became vacant when Justice Victorino Mapa was appointed Secretary of Finance and Justice. He later ascended to the position of Chief Justice in 1921, a position he held until his death on July 26, 1924.

Legal offices
Preceded by Victorino Mapa	Chief Justice of the Supreme Court of the Philippines; 1913–1921	Succeeded by Ramon Avanceña
Preceded by Victorino Mapa	Associate Justice of the Supreme Court of the Philippines; 1921–1924	Succeeded by Norberto Romualdez
