= César Bengzon =

Chief Justice of the Philippines from 1961 to 1966

The Honorable César Bengzon
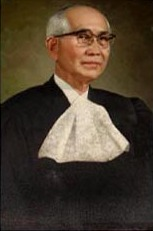
- Official portrait

9th Chief Justice of the Supreme Court of the Philippines
- In office April 28, 1961 – May 29, 1966
- Appointed by: Carlos P. Garcia
- Preceded by: Ricardo Paras Jr.
- Succeeded by: Roberto Concepcion

37th Associate Justice of the Supreme Court of the Philippines
- In office 1945–1961
- Appointed by: Sergio Osmeña
- Preceded by: Manuel Moran
- Succeeded by: Dionisio de Leon

Personal details
- Born: César Fernando Bengzon y Cabrera; May 29, 1896 Camiling, Tarlac, Captaincy General of the Philippines
- Died: September 3, 1992 (aged 96) Philippines
- Parent(s): Vicente Bengzon; Paz Cabrera

César Fernando Cabrera Bengzon (May 29, 1896 – September 3, 1992) was the Chief Justice of the Supreme Court of the Philippines from April 28, 1961 until May 29, 1966. In November 1966, a few months after his retirement, he became the first Filipino to be appointed to the International Court of Justice.

== Judicial career ==
Bengzon earned his Bachelor of Arts degree from Ateneo de Manila in 1915. He graduated his Bachelor of Laws from the University of the Philippines in 1919, and placed second in the Bar Examinations that same year.

Starting out as a law clerk, he was promoted to Solicitor General in 1932 and Undersecretary of Justice under Governor-General (later U.S. Supreme Court Justice) Frank Murphy in 1933. He was later appointed in 1936 to the Court of Appeals, and became an Associate Justice of the Supreme Court in 1945. He left the Supreme Court in 1948 to become Secretary of Justice under President Elpidio Quirino, but was reinstated a few months later.

In 1966, he became the first Filipino ever to be elected judge of the International Court of Justice. He held this position until 1976.

== Death ==
He died on September 3, 1992 at age 96. Upon to his death, he is the longest-lived former Chief Justice ever recorded.

Legal offices
Preceded by Manuel Moran	Associate Justice of the Supreme Court; 1945–1961	Succeeded by Dionisio de Leon
Preceded by Felicisimo R. Feria	Senior Associate Justice of the Supreme Court; 1953–1961	Succeeded by Sabino B. Padilla
Preceded by Ricardo Paras Jr.	Chief Justice of the Supreme Court of the Philippines; 1961–1966	Succeeded by Roberto Concepcion
