= Chief Justice of the Philippines =

Highest judicial officer

- Punong Mahistrado ng Pilipinas
- Seal of the Supreme Court

- Flag of the Supreme Court

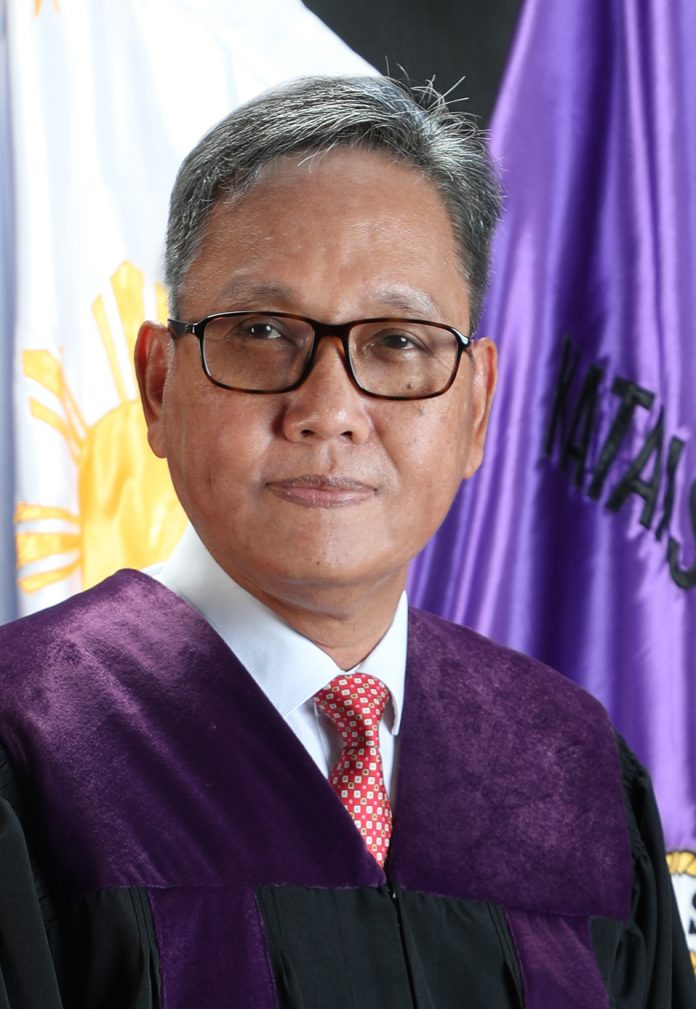
- Incumbent; Rodil Zalameda since November 6, 2026
- Style: The Honorable (formal); Your Honor (when addressed directly in court)
- Member of: Supreme Court; Presidential Electoral Tribunal; Judicial and Bar Council
- Appointer: Appointment by the President upon recommendation and nomination of the Judicial and Bar Council
- Term length: Life tenure; mandatory retirement at the age of 70
- Inaugural holder: 1583 - Santiago de Vera y Rivas, Captain-General of the Spanish East Indies (Real Audiencia, Spanish East Indies); 1901 - Cayetano Arellano (Supreme Court of the Philippines)
- Formation: June 11, 1901
- Website: Official Website

Chief Justice of the Philippines (Filipino: Punong Mahistrado ng Pilipinas) is the title of the person who presides over the Supreme Court and who is the highest judicial officer of the government. As of November 7, 2026, the position is currently held by Rodil Zalameda, who was appointed by president Bongbong Marcos following the retirement of Chief Justice Alexander Gesmundo on November 6, 2026.

The position of chief justice is the oldest major governmental office continually held by a Filipino. Cayetano Arellano became the first chief justice on June 11, 1901, predating the presidency and vice presidency (established in 1935), the Senate (1916, or September 1, 1901 if counting the Taft Commission), and the House of Representatives (1907, as the Philippine Assembly).

== Duties and powers ==
The power to appoint the chief justice lies with the president of the Philippines, who makes the selection from a list of three nominees prepared by the Judicial and Bar Council. There is no material difference in the process of selecting a chief justice from that in the selection of associate justices. As with the other justices of the Supreme Court, the chief justice is obliged to retire upon reaching the age of 70; otherwise there is no term limit for the chief justice. In the 1935 constitution, any person appointed by the president has to be confirmed by the Commission on Appointments; in the 1973 constitution, the person whom the president appointed did not have to undergo confirmation under the Commission on Appointments.

The current 1987 constitution does not ascribe any formal role to the chief justice other than as an ex-officio chairman of the Judicial and Bar Council and as the presiding officer in any impeachment trial of the president. The chief justice is also required to personally certify every decision that is rendered by the court. The chief justice carries only 1 vote out of 15 in the court, and is generally regarded, vis-a-vis the other justices, as the primus inter pares rather than as the administrative superior of the other members of the court.

Still, the influence a chief justice may bear within the court and judiciary, and on the national government cannot be underestimated. In the public eye, any particular Supreme Court is widely identified with the identity of the incumbent chief justice, hence appellations such as "The Fernando Court" or "The Puno Court". Moreover, the chief justice usually retains high public visibility, unlike the associate justices, who tend to labor in relative anonymity, with exceptions such as Associate Justice J. B. L. Reyes in the 1950s to 1970s.

By tradition, it is also the chief justice who swears into office the president of the Philippines. One notable deviation from that tradition came in 1986, and later again in 2010. Due to the exceptional political circumstances culminating in the People Power Revolution, on February 25, 1986, Corazon Aquino took her oath of office as president before Associate Justice Claudio Teehankee in San Juan just minutes before Ferdinand Marcos took his own oath of office also as president before Chief Justice Ramon Aquino. Marcos fled into exile later that night. More than two decades afterwards, Benigno Simeon Aquino III followed in his mother's footsteps (with almost similar reasons) by having Associate Justice Conchita Carpio-Morales administer his oath of office, rather than Chief Justice Renato Corona (who was eventually impeached halfway through Aquino's term). Six years later, in 2016, Rodrigo Duterte took his oath of office before Associate Justice Bienvenido Reyes, his classmate at San Beda College of Law, instead of Chief Justice Maria Lourdes Sereno (who would eventually be removed from her position through quo warranto after it was determined that she had been unlawfully holding office ab initio).

The chief justice also names the three justices each from the Supreme Court in the memberships of the House of Representatives Electoral Tribunal and the Senate Electoral Tribunal.

The chief justice is the chief executive officer of the Philippine judiciary system and together with the whole Supreme Court, exercises administrative supervision over all courts and personnel.

== List ==
No.	Portrait	Name (lifespan)	Tenure start	Tenure end	Tenure length	Appointed by
1st		Cayetano Arellano (1847–1920)	June 15, 1901	April 12, 1920	18 years, 302 days	William McKinley
2nd		Victorino Mapa (1852–1927)	July 1, 1920	October 31, 1921	1 year, 122 days	Woodrow Wilson
3rd		Manuel Araullo (1853–1924)	November 1, 1921	July 26, 1924 (Note: Died in office.)	2 years, 268 days	Warren G. Harding
4th		Ramón Avanceña (1872–1957)	April 1, 1925	December 24, 1941	16 years, 267 days	Calvin Coolidge
5th		José Abad Santos (1886–1942)	December 24, 1941	May 1, 1942 (Note: José Abad Santos was executed by the Imperial Japanese Army on May 1, 1942.)	128 days	Manuel L. Quezon
6th		José Yulo (1894–1976)	January 26, 1942	July 9, 1945	3 years, 164 days	Masaharu Homma
7th		Manuel Moran (1893–1961)	July 9, 1945	March 20, 1951	5 years, 254 days	Sergio Osmeña
8th		Ricardo Paras (1891–1984)	April 2, 1951	February 17, 1961	9 years, 321 days	Elpidio Quirino
9th		César Bengzon (1896–1992)	April 28, 1961	May 29, 1966	5 years, 31 days	Carlos P. Garcia
10th		Roberto Concepcion (1903–1987)	June 17, 1966	April 18, 1973	6 years, 305 days	Ferdinand Marcos
11th		Querube Makalintal (1910–2002)	October 21, 1973	December 22, 1975	2 years, 62 days	Ferdinand Marcos
12th		Fred Ruiz Castro (1914–1979)	January 5, 1976	April 19, 1979	3 years, 104 days	Ferdinand Marcos
13th		Enrique Fernando (1915–2004)	July 2, 1979	July 24, 1985	6 years, 22 days	Ferdinand Marcos
14th		Felix Makasiar (1915–1992)	July 25, 1985	November 19, 1985	117 days	Ferdinand Marcos
15th		Ramon Aquino (1917–1993)	November 20, 1985	March 6, 1986	106 days	Ferdinand Marcos
16th		Claudio Teehankee (1918–1989)	April 2, 1986	April 18, 1988	2 years, 16 days	Corazon Aquino
17th		Pedro Yap (1918–2003)	April 19, 1988	June 30, 1988	72 days	Corazon Aquino
18th		Marcelo Fernan (1927–1999)	July 1, 1988	December 6, 1991	3 years, 158 days	Corazon Aquino
19th		Andres Narvasa (1928–2013)	December 8, 1991	November 30, 1998	6 years, 357 days	Corazon Aquino
20th		Hilario Davide Jr. (born 1935)	November 30, 1998	December 20, 2005	7 years, 20 days	Joseph Estrada
21st		Artemio Panganiban (born 1937)	December 20, 2005	December 7, 2007	1 year, 352 days	Gloria Macapagal Arroyo
22nd		Reynato Puno (born 1940)	December 7, 2007	May 17, 2010	2 years, 161 days	Gloria Macapagal Arroyo
23rd		Renato Corona (1948–2016)	May 17, 2010	May 29, 2012 (Note: Renato Corona was impeached by the House of Representatives on December 12, 2011, and convicted by the Senate sitting as an impeachment court on May 29, 2012.)	2 years, 12 days	Gloria Macapagal Arroyo
—		Maria Lourdes Sereno (born 1960)	August 25, 2012	May 11, 2018 (Note: Maria Lourdes Sereno was removed as chief justice by the Supreme Court on May 11, 2018 over a quo warranto petition, making her appointment as chief justice null and void.)	5 years, 259 days	Benigno Aquino III
24th		Teresita de Castro (born 1948)	August 28, 2018	October 10, 2018	43 days	Rodrigo Duterte
25th		Lucas Bersamin (born 1949)	November 26, 2018	October 18, 2019	326 days	Rodrigo Duterte
26th		Diosdado Peralta (born 1952)	October 23, 2019	March 27, 2021	1 year, 155 days	Rodrigo Duterte
27th		Alexander Gesmundo (born 1956)	April 5, 2021	November 6, 2026	5 years, 215 days	Rodrigo Duterte
28th		Rodil Zalameda (born 1963)	November 6, 2026	Present	7 days	Bongbong Marcos

== Acting chief justices ==
The following became senior associate justices in their tenure in the Supreme Court:

Senior Associate Justice	Year appointed	Term as AJ	Tenure as Acting Chief Justice	
Florentino Torres	1901	1901-1920	April 1, 1920	April 20, 1920
Elias Finley Johnson	1903	1903-1933	April 20, 1920	July 1, 1920
Elias Finley Johnson	1903	1903-1933	October 31, 1921	November 1, 1921
Elias Finley Johnson	1903	1903-1933	July 26, 1924	April 1, 1925
José Abad Santos	1932	1932-1941	December 24, 1941	
Manuel V. Moran	1938	1938-1945	May 1, 1942	May 7, 1942
Ricardo M. Paras Jr.	1941	1941-1951	March 20, 1951	April 2, 1951
César F. Bengzon	1945	1945-1961	February 17, 1961	April 28, 1961
Roberto R. Concepcion	1954	1954-1966	May 29, 1966	June 17, 1966
Querube C. Makalintal	1962	1962-1973	April 18, 1973	October 21, 1973
Fred Ruiz Castro	1966	1966-1975	December 22, 1975	January 5, 1976
Enrique M. Fernando Sr.	1967	1967-1979	April 19, 1979	July 2, 1979
Claudio Teehankee Sr.	1968	1979-1986	July 24, 1985	July 25, 1985
Claudio Teehankee Sr.	1968	1979-1986	November 19, 1985	November 20, 1985
Claudio Teehankee Sr.	1968	1979-1986	March 6, 1987	April 1, 1987
Ameurfina Melencio-Herrera	1979 1986 (reappointed)	1979-1992	April 18, 1988	April 19, 1988
Ameurfina Melencio-Herrera	1979 1986 (reappointed)	1979-1992	June 30, 1988	July 1, 1988
Ameurfina Melencio-Herrera	1979 1986 (reappointed)	1979-1992	December 6, 1991	December 8, 1991
Flerida Ruth P. Romero	1991	1991-1999	November 30, 1998	
Reynato S. Puno	1993	1993	December 20, 2005	
Leonardo A. Quisumbing	1998	1998-2009	December 7, 2005	
Antonio T. Carpio	2001	2001-2019	May 17, 2010	
Antonio T. Carpio	2001	2001-2019	May 28, 2012	August 25, 2012
Antonio T. Carpio	2001	2001-2019	May 11, 2018	August 28, 2018
Antonio T. Carpio	2001	2001-2019	October 10, 2018	November 28, 2018
Antonio T. Carpio	2001	2001-2019	October 17, 2019	October 23, 2019
Estela M. Perlas-Bernabe	2011	2011-2022	March 27, 2022	April 5, 2022

== Demographics ==
=== Longevity ===
Order	Chief justice	Birth	Death	Age
1	César Bengzon	May 29, 1896	September 3, 1992	96 years, 97 days
2	Ricardo Paras	February 17, 1891	October 10, 1984	93 years, 236 days
3	Querube Makalintal	December 11, 1910	November 8, 2002	91 years, 333 days
4	Hilario Davide Jr.	December 20, 1935	Living	90 years, 328 days
5	Enrique Fernando	July 25, 1915	October 3, 2004	89 years, 70 days
6	Artemio Panganiban	December 7, 1937	Living	88 years, 341 days
7	Reynato Puno	May 17, 1940	Living	86 years, 180 days
8	Pedro Yap	July 1, 1918	November 20, 2003	86 years, 142 days
9	Ramón Avanceña	April 13, 1872	June 12, 1957	85 years, 60 days
10	Andres Narvasa	November 30, 1928	October 31, 2013	84 years, 335 days
11	Roberto Concepcion	June 7, 1903	May 3, 1987	83 years, 330 days
12	José Yulo	September 24, 1894	October 27, 1976	82 years, 33 days
13	Teresita Leonardo-de Castro	October 8, 1948	Living	78 years, 36 days
14	Ramon Aquino	November 20, 1915	March 31, 1993	77 years, 131 days
15	Lucas Bersamin	October 18, 1949	Living	77 years, 26 days
16	Diosdado Peralta	March 27, 1952	Living	74 years, 231 days
17	Felix Makasiar	August 31, 1917	February 19, 1992	74 years, 172 days
18	Cayetano Arellano	March 2, 1847	December 20, 1920	73 years, 293 days
19	Marcelo Fernan	October 24, 1926	July 11, 1999	72 years, 260 days
20	Victorino Mapa	February 25, 1855	April 12, 1927	72 years, 46 days
21	Manuel Araullo	January 1, 1853	July 26, 1924	71 years, 207 days
22	Claudio Teehankee	April 18, 1918	July 11, 1989	71 years, 84 days
23	Alexander Gesmundo	November 6, 1956	Living	70 years, 7 days
24	Manuel Moran	October 27, 1893	August 23, 1961	67 years, 300 days
25	Renato Corona	October 15, 1948	April 29, 2016	67 years, 197 days
26	Fred Ruiz Castro	September 2, 1914	April 19, 1979	64 years, 229 days
27	Rodil Zalameda	August 2, 1963	Living	63 years, 103 days
28	José Abad Santos	February 19, 1886	May 2, 1942	56 years, 72 days

=== By age group ===
Age group	Total	%
Centenarians	0	0%
Nonagenarians	3	11%
Octogenarians	8	29%
Septugenarians	9	32%
Sexagenarian	7	25%
Quincagenarian	1	4%
Chief justices:	28	

=== By gender ===
Gender	Total	%
Male	26	93%
Female	2	7%
Chief justices:	28	100%

=== By appointing president ===
President	Total	%
Ferdinand Marcos (KBL/Nacionalista)	6	21%
Corazon Aquino (UNIDO/Independent)	4	14%
Rodrigo Duterte (PDP–Laban)	4	14%
Gloria Macapagal Arroyo (Lakas)	3	11%
William McKinley (Republican)	1	4%
Woodrow Wilson (Democratic)	1	4%
Warren G. Harding (Republican)	1	4%
Calvin Coolidge (Republican)	1	4%
Manuel L. Quezon (Nacionalista)	1	4%
Sergio Osmeña (Nacionalista)	1	4%
Japanese Military Administration	1	4%
Elpidio Quirino (Liberal)	1	4%
Carlos P. Garcia (Nacionalista)	1	4%
Joseph Estrada (LAMMP)	1	4%
Benigno Aquino III (Liberal)	1	4%
Chief justices:	28	100%

=== By law school ===
Law school	Total	%
University of the Philippines College of Law	14	50%
University of Santo Tomas Faculty of Civil Law	7	25%
Ateneo School of Law	3	11%
Escuela de Derecho	1	4%
Far Eastern University Institute of Law	1	4%
Northwestern University School of Law	1	4%
University of the East College of Law	1	4%
Chief justices:	28	100%

== Notable chief justices ==
- José Yulo is the only former speaker of the House of Representatives to be subsequently appointed as chief justice. Meanwhile, Fred Ruiz Castro previously served as Executive Secretary before his subsequent appointment as chief justice. Another, Querube Makalintal, would be elected as Speaker of the Interim Batasang Pambansa (parliament) after his retirement from the court. On the other hand, Marcelo Fernan would, after his resignation from the court, be elected to the Senate and later serve as president of the Senate. Other chief justices served in prominent positions in public service after their retirement include Manuel Moran (ambassador to Spain and the Vatican), Hilario Davide, Jr. (ambassador to the United Nations), and Lucas Bersamin (Executive Secretary). In addition, César Bengzon was elected as the first Filipino to sit as a judge on the International Court of Justice shortly after his retirement in 1966.
- Roberto Concepcion was reputedly so disappointed with the court's ruling in Javellana v. Executive Secretary where the majority affirmed the validity of the 1973 Constitution despite recognizing the flaws in its ratification, that he retired two months prior to his reaching the mandatory retirement age of 70. Thirteen years later, after the ouster of Marcos, the 83-year-old Concepcion was appointed a member of the 1986 Constitutional Commission tasked with drafting a new constitution. Drawing from his experiences as chief justice in the early days of martial law, Concepcion introduced several new innovations designed to assure the independence of the Supreme Court, such as the Judicial and Bar Council and the express conferment on the court the power to review any acts of government.
- The longest period one person served as chief justice was 18 years, 294 days in the case of Cayetano Arellano, who served from 1901 to 1920. Arellano was 73 years, 29 days old upon his resignation, the greatest age ever reached by an incumbent chief justice, and a record unlikely to be broken with the current mandatory retirement age of 70.
- The shortest tenure of any chief justice was of Teresita Leonardo-de Castro, who served as chief justice for a mere 43 days upon reaching her mandatory retirement age of 70. The previous record was that of Pedro Yap, who served as chief justice for 73 days in 1988. Other chief justices who served for less than a year were Felix Makasiar (85 days), Ramon Aquino (78 days), and Artemio Panganiban (352 days). Of these chief justices, all but Aquino left office upon reaching the mandatory retirement age of 70; Aquino resigned in 1986 after the newly installed President Corazon Aquino asked for the courtesy resignations of all the members of the court.
- The oldest person appointed as chief justice was Teresita Leonardo-de Castro, who was 69 years, 324 days old upon her appointment in 2018. Other persons appointed as chief justice in their 69th year were Pedro Yap (69 years, 292 days old); Felix Makasiar (69 years, 280 days old); Artemio Panganiban (69 years, 13 days old); and Lucas Bersamin (69 years, 41 days). The youngest person named as chief justice was Manuel Moran, who was 51 years, 256 days old upon his appointment.
- Claudio Teehankee had to wait for nearly 18 years as associate justice before he was appointed as chief justice. He was twice bypassed by Ferdinand Marcos in favor a more junior associate justice before he was finally appointed chief justice by Corazon Aquino. Of the Filipino associate justices, Florentino Torres, J. B. L. Reyes, and Antonio Carpio served at least 18 years in the court without getting the appointment to become chief justice. In contrast, Pedro Yap had served as associate justice for only 2 years, 10 days before he was promoted as chief justice. Also notable is Maria Lourdes Sereno's 2 year and 12 day term as associate justice before her de facto term as chief justice.
- The longest-lived chief justice was César Bengzon, who died in 1992 aged 96 years, 97 days old. Two other chief justices lived past 90: Ricardo Paras (93 years, 235 days) and Querube Makalintal (91 years, 322 days).
- The youngest chief justice to die was José Abad Santos, who was executed by the Japanese army in 1942 at age 56 years, 77 days. The youngest chief justice to die from non-violent causes was Fred Ruiz Castro, who died in 1979 of a heart attack inflight to India, at age 64 years, 231 days. Abad Santos, Castro, and Manuel Araullo are the only chief justices to die while in office.
- The first chief justice to be impeached is Renato Corona. On December 12, 2011, 188 of the 285 members of House of Representatives voted to transmit to the Senate the Articles of Impeachment filed against him. On May 29, 2012, the Senate, voting 20–3, convicted Corona under Article II pertaining to his failure to disclose to the public his statement of assets, liabilities, and net worth.
- Maria Lourdes Sereno was the first female appointed to serve as chief justice, following the impeachment of Renato Corona and deliberations by the Judicial and Bar Council in 2012 (her successor Teresita Leonardo-de Castro is the de jure first female chief justice). If not for the quo warranto petition which was granted on May 11, 2018, that removed her from the post as well as voiding her appointment and declaring her tenure as a de facto term, she would have been the second chief justice to similarly undergo impeachment proceedings as her late predecessor, Corona. Her ouster was made final on June 19, 2018, by the denial with finality (meaning no further pleading would be entertained, as well as for the immediate entry for judgment) of her ad cautelam motion for reconsideration filed on May 31, 2018, pleading for the reversal of her ouster via quo warranto.

== Gallery ==
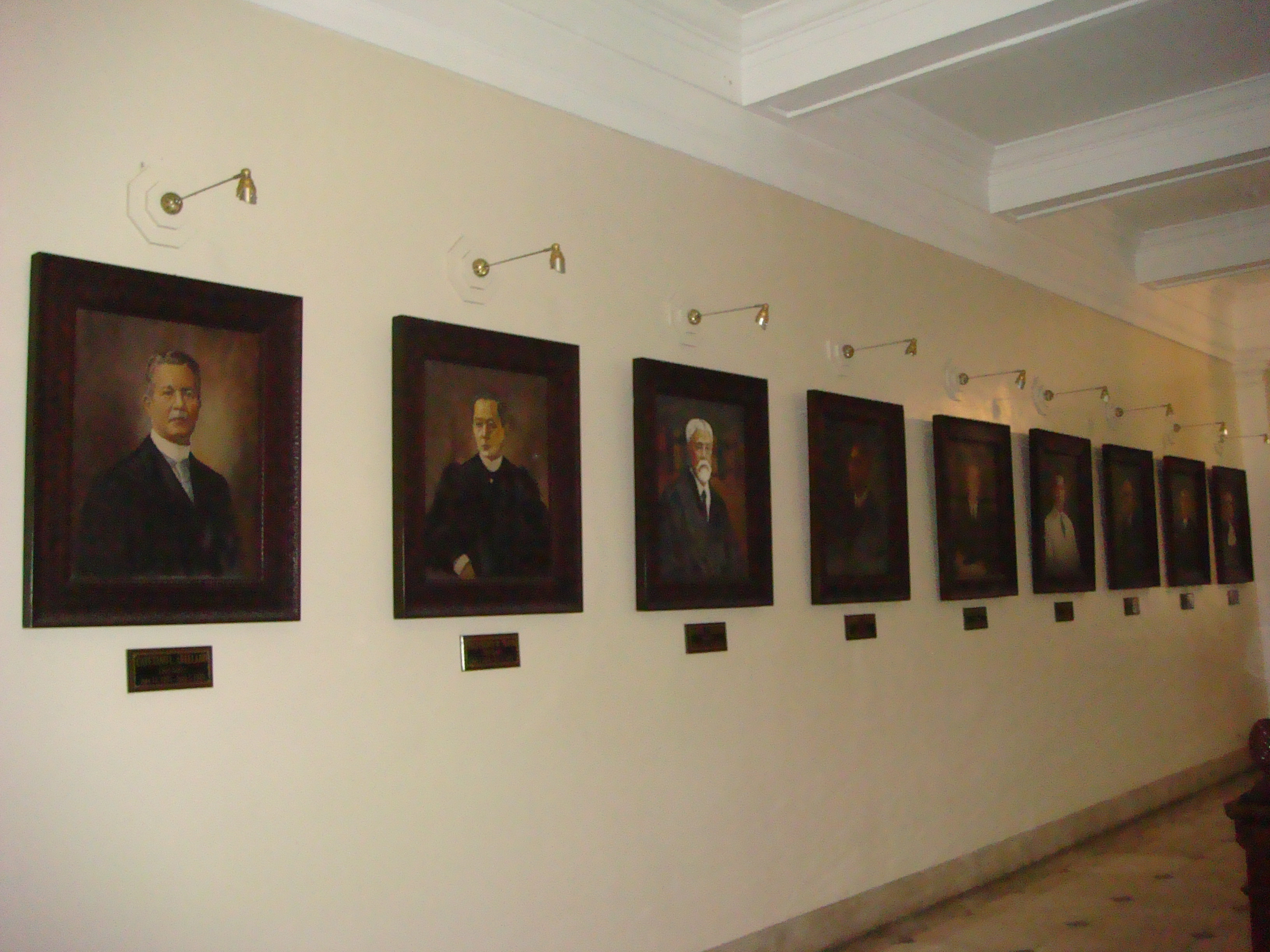
Portraits of the chief justices at the Supreme Court Building

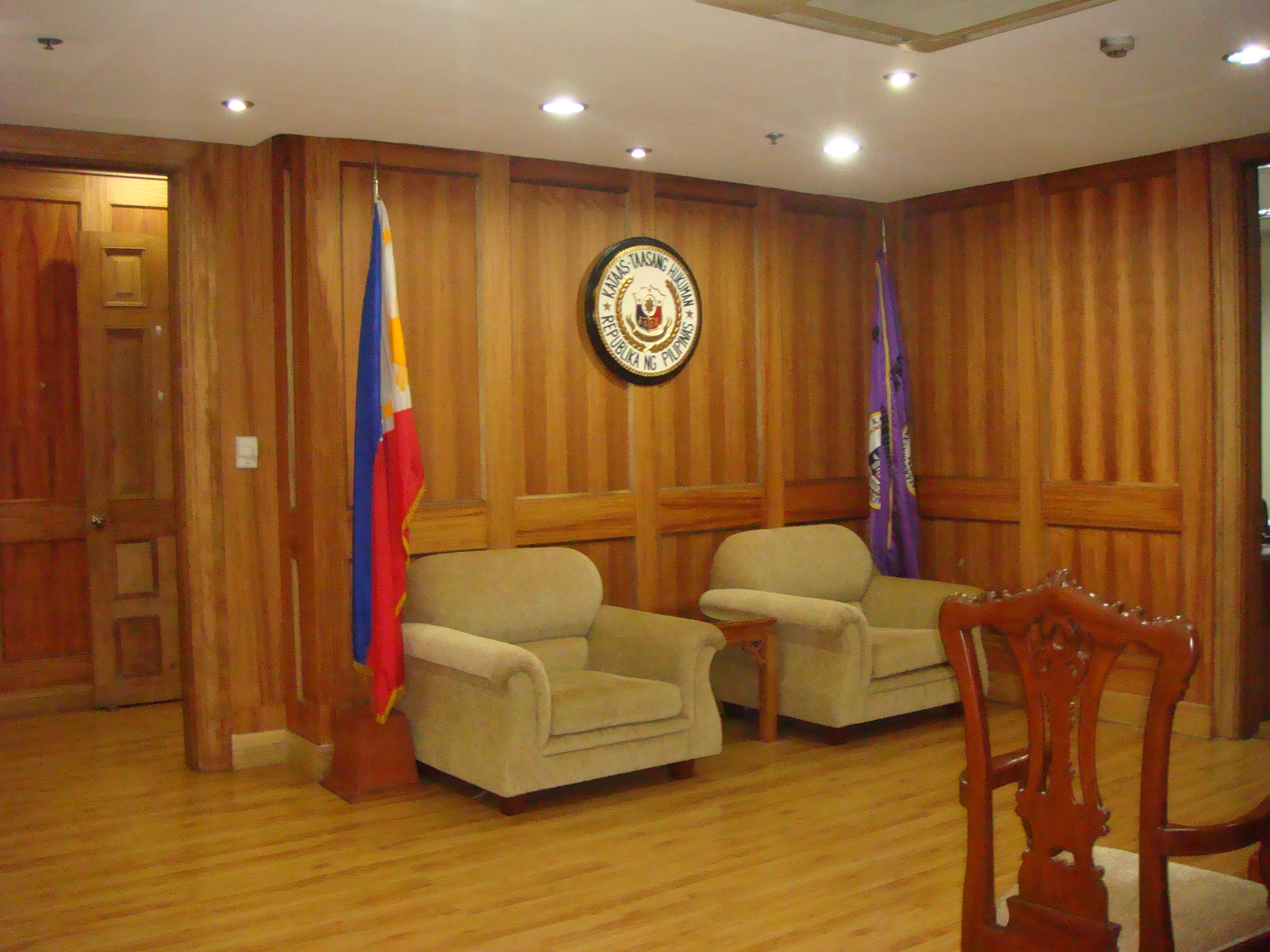
The chief justice's judicial chambers

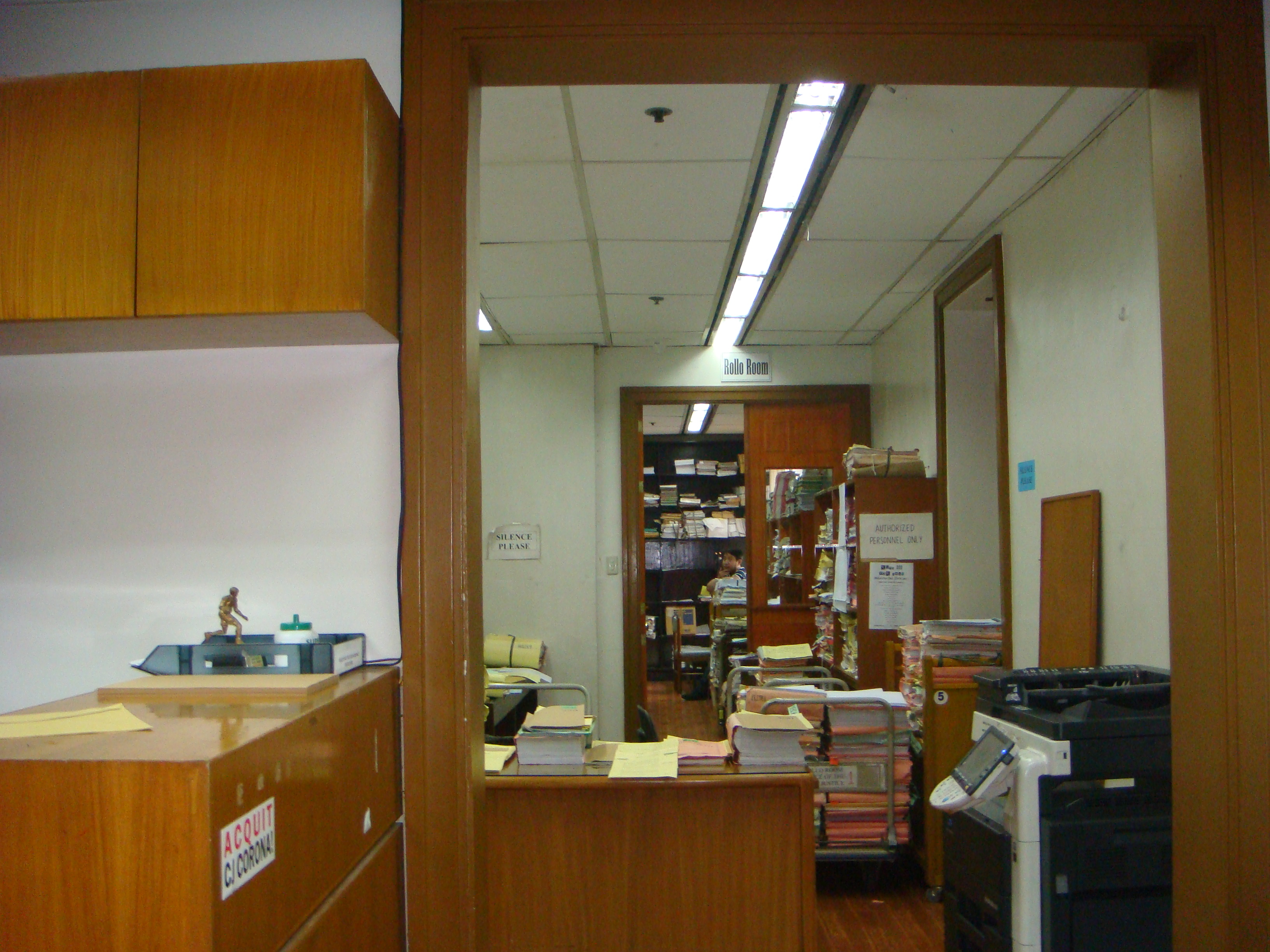
Reception room for the Office of the Chief Justice

== See also ==
- Associate Justice of the Supreme Court of the Philippines
- Supreme Court of the Philippines
- Constitution of the Philippines
- Justices of the Supreme Court of the Philippines
