= José Yulo =

Chief Justice of the Philippines from 1942 to 1945

The Honorable José Yulo
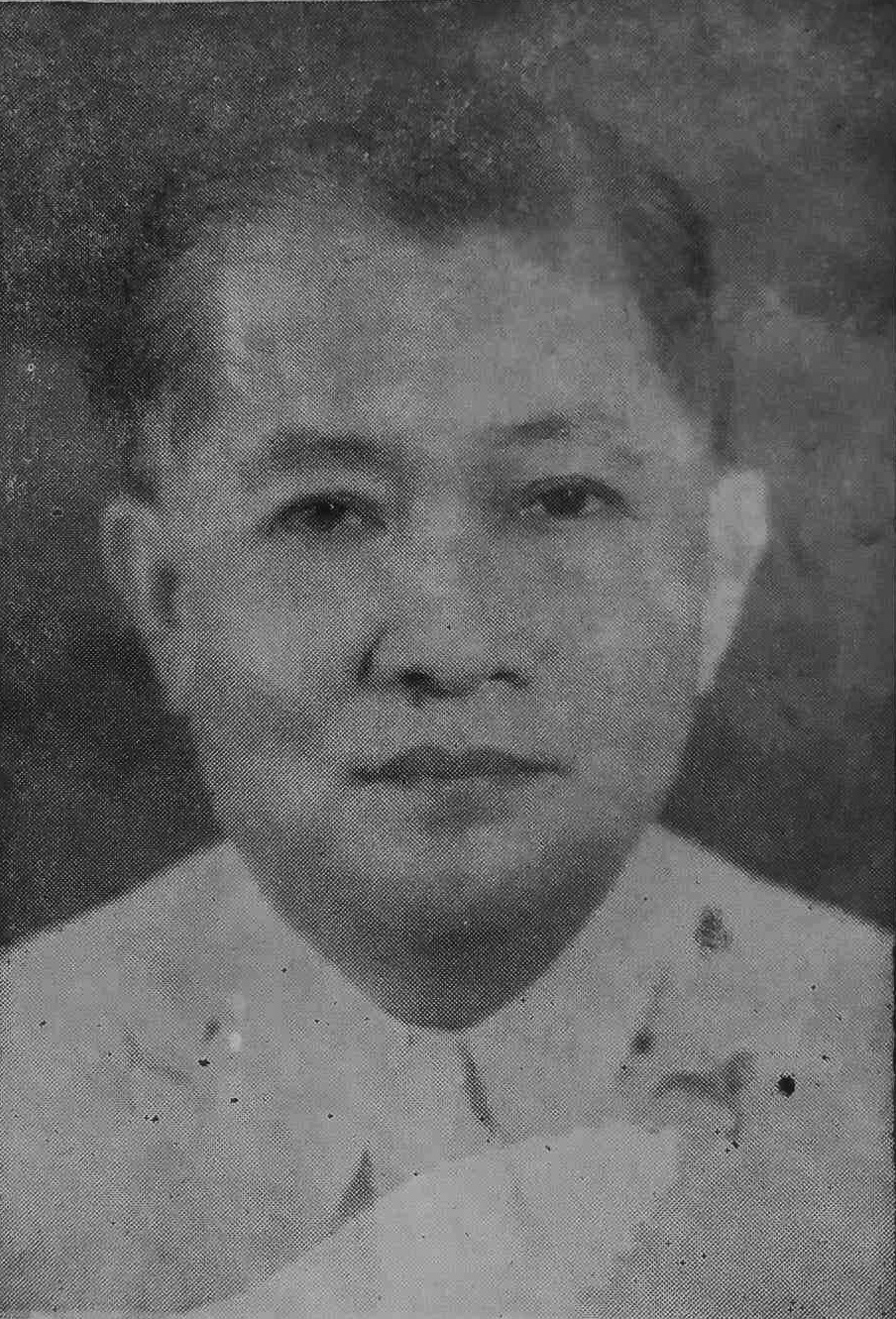

6th Chief Justice of the Philippines
- In office May 7, 1942 – July 9, 1945
- Appointed by: Masaharu Homma
- Preceded by: José Abad Santos
- Succeeded by: Manuel Moran

Associate Justice of the Supreme Court of the Philippines
- In office February 5, 1942 – May 7, 1942
- Appointed by: Manuel L. Quezon
- Preceded by: Carlos Imperial
- Succeeded by: Domingo Imperial

13th and 34th Secretary of Justice
- In office January 1, 1966 – August 4, 1967
- President: Ferdinand Marcos
- Preceded by: Salvador Marino
- Succeeded by: Claudio Teehankee
- In office July 6, 1934 – November 15, 1938
- President: Manuel L. Quezon
- Governor-General: Frank Murphy
- Preceded by: Quirico Abeto
- Succeeded by: José Abad Santos

Senator of the Philippines
- In office July 9, 1945 – May 28, 1946

Speaker of the National Assembly of the Philippines
- In office January 24, 1939 – December 30, 1941
- Preceded by: Gil Montilla
- Succeeded by: Benigno Aquino Sr.

Member of the National Assembly from Negros Occidental's 3rd district
- In office December 30, 1938 – December 30, 1941
- Preceded by: Gil Montilla
- Succeeded by: District abolished (Next held by Raymundo Vargas)

Personal details
- Born: September 24, 1894 Bago, Negros Occidental, Captaincy General of the Philippines
- Died: October 27, 1976 (aged 82) Makati, Philippines
- Resting place: Yulo Family Mausoleum, Canlubang, Calamba City, Laguna
- Party: Liberal (from 1946)
- Other political affiliations: Nacionalista (until 1946)
- Spouse: Cecilia Sitchon Araneta (m. 1922; died 1954) Tomasa Gachapin (m. 1960)
- Relations: Leandro Locsin (son-in-law)
- Children: 6
- Education: University of the Philippines Diliman (LL.B)
- Occupation: Politician
- Profession: Lawyer

José Yulo Sr. (September 24, 1894 – October 27, 1976) was the Chief Justice of the Supreme Court of the Philippines from May 1942 until July 1945 during the Japanese Occupation and was Speaker of the National Assembly of the Philippines from 1939 until World War II started in 1941. Yulo served in all of the branches of government: the legislative as House Speaker, congressman, and senator; the executive as Secretary of Justice and member of the Cabinet; and the judiciary as the Associate Justice and Chief Justice of the Supreme Court of the Philippines. He and his family also owned the Canlubang Sugar Estate that they bought in 1948.

== Early life and career ==
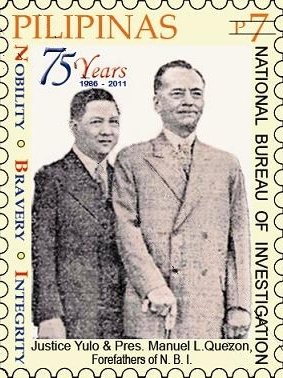
José Yulo and Manuel L. Quezon, the forefathers of the National Bureau of Investigation, on a 2011 stamp of the Philippines

Yulo was born on September 24, 1894, in Bago, Negros Occidental to Sofronio Evangelista Yulo and Segunda Yulo (maiden name). He obtained his Bachelor of Laws degree at the University of the Philippines and placed third in the Philippine Bar Examination of 1913; however, due to his age, did not practice law until two years later. He became distinguished as one of the best corporation lawyers in the Philippines.

Appointed as Justice Secretary by Governor-General Frank Murphy and President Manuel L. Quezon in 1934 and 1935, he was elected to the National Assembly of the Philippines representing the province of Negros Occidental, becoming its Speaker under the ruling Nacionalista Party on its convening session in 1939. The 1935 Philippine Constitution was amended in 1940 changing the unicameral legislature system into a bicameral system; thus the National Assembly was divided into a Senate and a House of Representatives. Yulo remained as Speaker of the National Assembly. Yulo was elected to the Senate in 1941 for the 1st Congress of the Commonwealth of the Philippines but did not serve immediately as he was arrested by the US Army's Counter-Intelligence Corps (CIC) because he had worked in various capacities under the Japanese-sponsored Philippine Government. Following the Japanese conquest of the Philippines in 1942, he became a member of the Preparatory Committee for Philippine Independence, and upon the establishment of the Second Philippine Republic in 1943, was appointed Chief Justice of the Supreme Court. He is the only former Speaker of the House of Representatives of the Philippines to be subsequently appointed Chief Justice. He finally served his elected Senate term in 1945, lasting until 1946.

== Accomplishments ==
Despite the difficulties experienced under Japanese occupation, Yulo attempted to maintain the integrity of the judiciary despite pressure from the Japanese military to sway decisions on certain cases.

== Postwar years ==
Yulo was the vice presidential candidate of the Liberal Party in 1953 as the running mate of incumbent President Elpidio Quirino. He eventually lost to Senator Carlos P. Garcia, while Quirino lost his re-election bid to former National Defense Secretary Ramon Magsaysay.

He was the presidential candidate of the Liberal Party in the 1957 presidential election, eventually losing to Garcia, who is the incumbent President this time, once again. His running mate, Pampanga's 1st district representative Diosdado Macapagal, won the vice presidential race.

Yulo was later appointed by President Ferdinand Marcos as Secretary of Justice, and served from January 1, 1966, to August 4, 1967.

== Death ==
Yulo died of respiratory failure as a result of atherosclerosis at Makati Medical Center in Makati on October 27, 1976. He was buried in Canlubang, Calamba, Laguna on October 30, 1976.

Political offices
Preceded by Quirico Abeto	Secretary of Justice; 1934–1938	Succeeded by José Abad Santos
Preceded by Gil Montilla	Speaker of the National Assembly; 1938–1941	Succeeded by Benigno Aquino, Sr.
Preceded by Salvador L. Marino	Secretary of Justice; 1966–1967	Succeeded by Claudio Teehankee
Legal offices
Preceded by José Abad Santos	Chief Justice of the Supreme Court of the Philippines; 1942–1945	Succeeded by Manuel Moran
Party political offices
Preceded by Elpidio Quirino	Liberal Party nominee for Vice President of the Philippines; 1953	Succeeded by Diosdado Macapagal
Preceded by Fernando Lopez (Quirino wing); Vicente J. Francisco (Avelino wing)	Liberal Party nominee for President of the Philippines; 1957; Served alongside: Antonio Quirino (Quirino wing)	Succeeded by Diosdado Macapagal
