= Ricardo Paras =

Chief Justice of the Philippines from 1951 to 1961

The Honourable Ricardo M. Parás Jr.
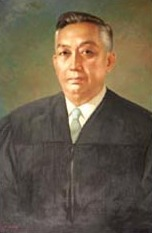

8th Chief Justice of the Supreme Court of the Philippines
- In office April 2, 1951 – February 17, 1961
- Appointed by: Elpidio Quirino
- Preceded by: Manuel Moran
- Succeeded by: César Bengzon

36th Associate Justice of the Supreme Court of the Philippines
- In office December 28, 1941 – April 2, 1951
- Appointed by: Manuel L. Quezon

Member of the Philippine House of Representatives from Tayabas's 2nd district
- In office June 3, 1919 – June 6, 1922
- Preceded by: Gregorio Nieva
- Succeeded by: Rafael R. Vilar

Personal details
- Born: Ricardo Parás Jr. y Mercader; February 17, 1891 Boac, Mindoro, Captaincy General of the Philippines
- Died: October 10, 1984 (aged 93) Manila, Philippines
- Education: University of the Philippines Manila (BL)

Ricardo Mercader Parás Jr. (February 17, 1891 – October 10, 1984) was the Chief Justice of the Supreme Court of the Philippines from April 2, 1951 until February 17, 1961.

== Career ==
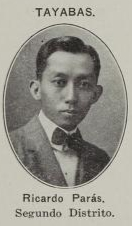
Paras as member of the House of Representatives, c. 1921

He earned his Bachelor of Laws degree from the University of the Philippines in 1913, and placed second (after future president Manuel Roxas) in the bar examinations that same year. He engaged in private law practice before being elected in the House of Representatives in 1919. His judicial career started when he was appointed judge in 1924, and later on appointed in 1936 to the Court of Appeals. He became an associate justice in 1941, and was a member of the wartime judiciary during the Japanese Occupation. He was appointed Chief Justice of the Supreme Court ten years later.

== Accomplishments ==
Paras made a frugal approach in order to survive and maintain the efficiency of service during the post-war years. He advocated the elimination of the case backlog, and encouraged speedy adjudication and deliberation of the cases. His dedication to such advocacy paid off, when there was no more backlog upon his retirement in 1961.

== Trivia ==
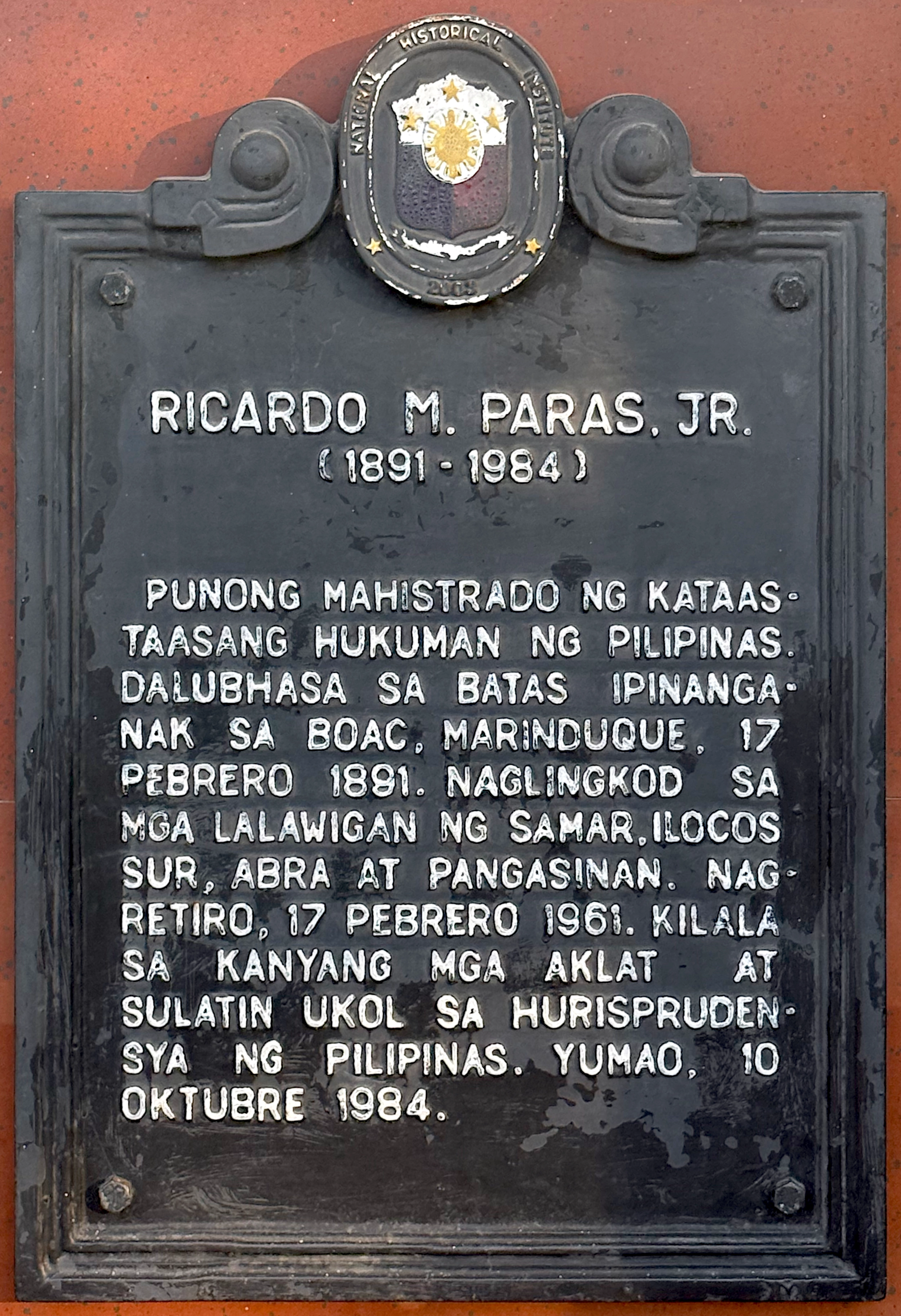
National historical marker installed in 2003 at Paras's hometown

His son, Edgardo L. Paras, became an associate justice of the Supreme Court from 1986 to 1992.

According to Justice J.B.L. Reyes, during the deliberations of the People v. Hernandez rebellion case, Justice Sabino Padilla (who is the brother of the solicitor general arguing for the government) openly accused Chief Justice Paras of being prejudiced against the government and asking biased questions during the oral argument. Riled, Parás rebutted, and a heated exchange soon ensued, which would have worsened had not they restrained themselves.

House of Representatives of the Philippines
Preceded by Gregorio Nieva	Representative, Tayabas's 2nd District; 1919–1922	Succeeded by Rafael R. Vilar
Legal offices
Preceded by Manuel Moran	Chief Justice of the Supreme Court of the Philippines; 1951–1961	Succeeded by César Bengzon
