= Quezon Eco-Tourism Road =

Road in Quezon, Philippines

Quezon Eco-Tourism Road

Route information
- Maintained by Department of Public Works and Highways – Quezon 2nd District Engineering Office
- Length: 29.829 km (18.535 mi)
- Existed: 2016–present
- Component highways: N422

Major junctions
- Southwest end: N422-1 (Rosario–San Juan–Candelaria Road) in Sariaya
- N606 (Sariaya Diversion Road) in Lucena; N606 (Old Manila South Road) in Lucena
- Northeast end: AH 26 (N1) (Lucena Diversion Road) in Lucena

Location
- Country: Philippines
- Provinces: Quezon
- Major cities: Lucena
- Towns: Sariaya

Highway system
- Roads in the Philippines; Highways; Expressways; List

The Quezon Eco-Tourism Road is a 29.8-kilometer (18.5 mi), two-to-eight lane scenic road in the province of Quezon, Philippines.

The road forms part of National Route 422 (N422) of the Philippine highway network. Previously, the road was originally unnumbered as a barangay road at the time of completion.

== Route description ==
After experiencing delays due to right-of-way issues, it finally opened to traffic in March 2016, the road bypasses the town propers of Candelaria and Sariaya and runs mostly in parallel to the southern coast of Quezon. It starts from Rosario–San Juan–Candelaria Road in the west and ends at the Lucena Diversion Road (Maharlika Highway) in Lucena. Travelers from Batangas shortens the travel time as an alternate route to the Bicol Region. Along the roadway, it is a scenic road—where it passes the agricultural land and plantations in the Quezon province.

The road is currently being extended to the north towards Tayabas and to the west to San Antonio via the Quezon Eco-Tourism-Sariaya-Candelaria-Tiaong-San Antonio Road.

== Intersections ==
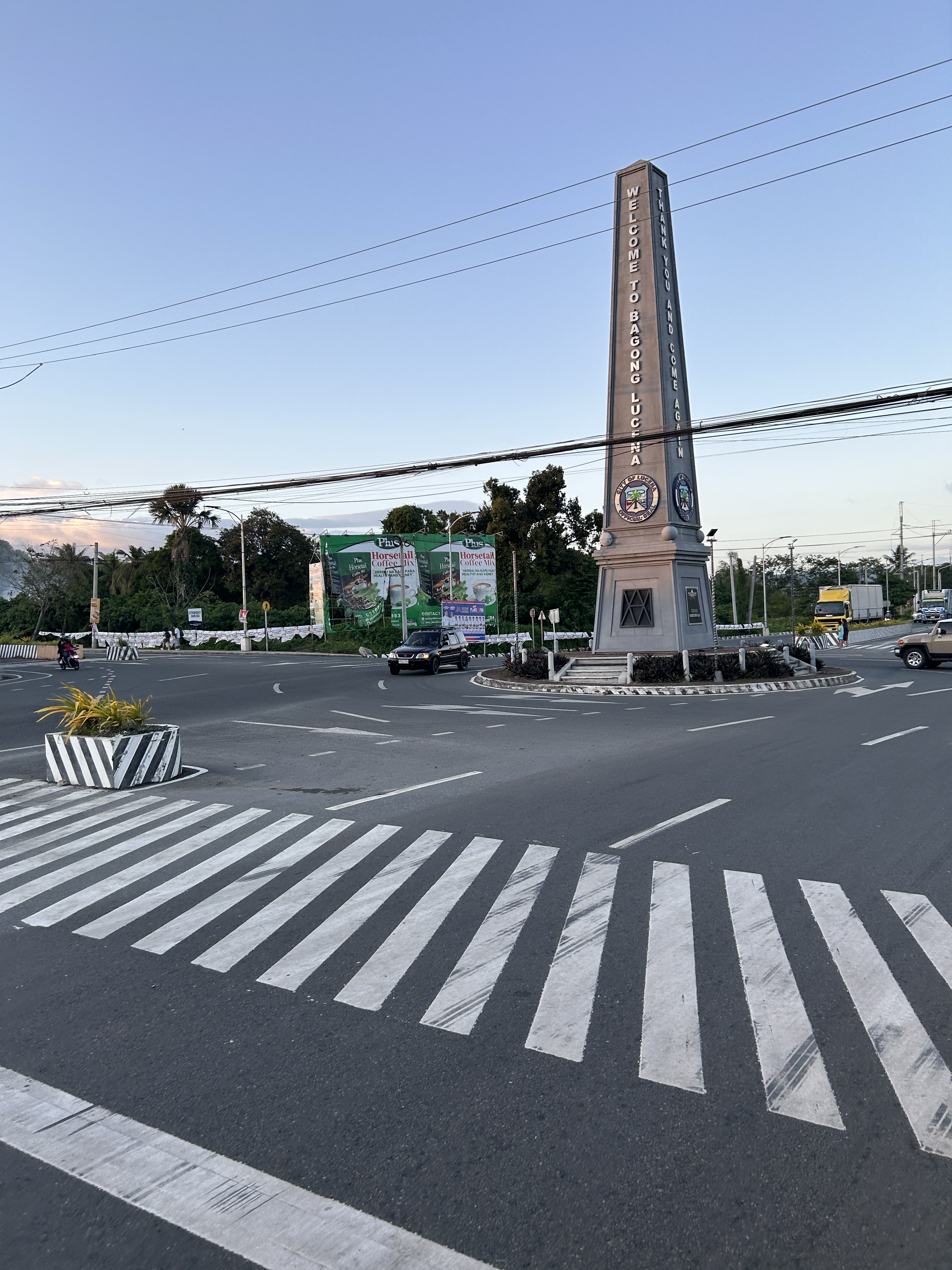
Lucena City Obelisk at the Bagong Lucena Welcome Circle roundabout in Lucena

Intersections are numbered by kilometer posts, with Rizal Park in Manila designated as kilometer zero.

Province	City/Municipality	km	mi	Destinations	Notes
Quezon	Sariaya			N422-1 (Rosario–San Juan–Candelaria Road)	Southwestern terminus
Quezon	Sariaya			Lutucan–Guisguis Road	
Lucena				N606 (Sariaya Diversion Road) – Sariaya	
Lucena				N606 (Old Manila South Road)	Bagong Lucena Welcome Circle roundabout
Lucena				AH 26 (N1) (Lucena Diversion Road)	Northeastern terminus
1.000 mi = 1.609 km; 1.000 km = 0.621 mi
