= Agawan Festival =

Annual harvest festival in Quezon, Philippines

- Observed by: Sariaya, Quezon Province
- Type: Religious (Catholic) and Cultural
- Date: May 15

Agawan Festival is an annual harvest festival held in Sariaya, Quezon, Philippines every 15 May in honor to Saint Isidore the Laborer, the patron saint of agriculture and good harvest. The celebration is known as the Happy Pandemonium and one of the four harvest festivals celebrated in the province of Quezon every May 14 or 15th.

== Etymology ==
The festival name, Agawan, was the idea of Rev. Fr. Raul Enriquez, the former town's parish priest and former president of Sariaya Tourism Council and the proponent of the town's Quadricentennial celebration in 1999.

== Events and Highlights ==
The main feature of the fiesta procession as the parade winds its way through the streets, people snatch the goodies and other produce hanging on the houses they pass by or on a pabitin, specially made for the parade. At the same time, people in the houses throw food, fruits and money into the parade. Before the parade, nearby residents decorate the outside of their homes. Colorful buntal hats are festooned all over the façade of houses. String beans are draped on windows to make curtains and banana trees are used to adorn fences. The primary, and most traditional, element in the decoration was the bagakay, or young bamboo branches from which junk food, native delicacies such as the kiping, fruits, candies and money were hung for people to snatch as they pass by. The term agawan, which is based on the Tagalog word for "snatch", also pertains for the passerby's scramble to get these goods from the bagakay.

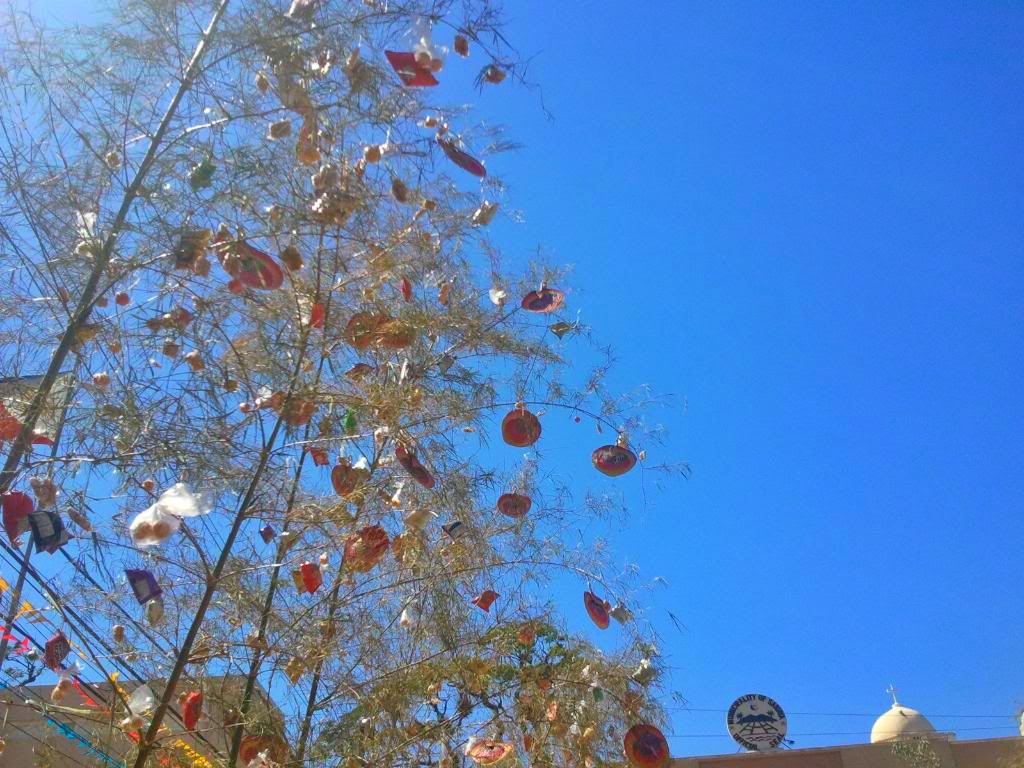
Bagakays

== See also ==
- Pahiyas, another feast dedicated to Saint Isidore the Labourer that coincides with the Agawan Festival
