= Emiliano A. Gala =

Filipino physician and politician

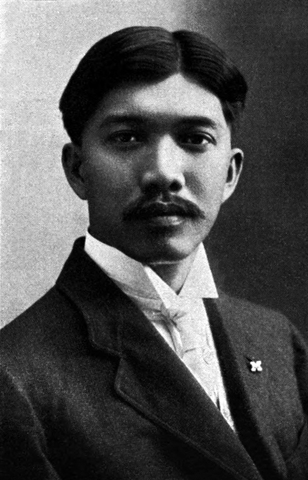
- Gala as member of the Philippine Assembly, c. 1908

Member of the Philippine Assembly from Tayabas's 2nd district
- In office 1907–1909
- Preceded by: position established
- Succeeded by: Gregorio Nieva

Personal details
- Born: 8 February 1881 Sariaya, Tayabas, Captaincy General of the Philippines
- Died: 19 January 1942 (aged 60) Candelaria, Tayabas, Philippines
- Party: Independent
- Education: Colegio de San Juan de Letran (BA); University of Santo Tomas (MD); University of Michigan Law School

Emiliano Alcala Gala (February 8, 1881 — January 19, 1942) was a Filipino physician and lawyer who became a member of the Philippine Assembly representing Tayabas's 2nd congressional district from 1907 to 1909.

== Biography ==
He was born in Sariaya, Tayabas on February 8, 1881. He studied at the Colegio de San Juan de Letran where he gained his Bachelor of Arts degree and studied medicine at the University of Santo Tomas. Due to the Filipino revolution against Spain, he postponed his studies and returned to Sariaya. After the revolution, he went to Manila and gained his medical degree in 1901. He also took his second-year medical exam that same year.

He went abroad to the United States to study law at the University of Michigan Law School. After receiving his law degree in 1906, Gala became a practicing lawyer in the United States. During his time in the US, he opposed a bill in the Indiana State Senate banning Americans from marrying Filipinos. He initiated Filipino protests which gained attention from the American press and gained the attention of the US Congress in Washington.

In July 1906, he returned to the Philippines. Gala ran for the Philippine Assembly and was elected as a representative for Tayabas's 2nd district. Gala was the only assembly member educated in the United States.

Aside from his political career, Gala dedicated his time to his coconut plantation and became president of the Tayabas Bar Association until his death.

=== Death ===
In January 19, 1942 after visiting the Candelaria municipal office for business purposes, Gala died in a road accident after a coconut tree fell on the carromata he was riding.
