= Gregorio Nieva =

Filipino journalist and lawyer (1880–1951)

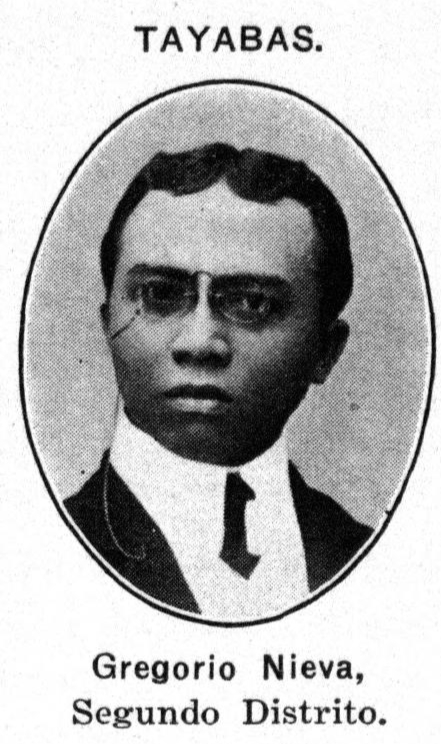
- Nieva as member of the Philippine House of Representatives, c. 1917

Member of the House of Representatives of the Philippines from Tayabas's 2nd district
- In office 1909–1912
- Preceded by: Emiliano A. Gala
- Succeeded by: Bernardo del Mundo
- In office 1916–1919
- Preceded by: Bernardo del Mundo
- Succeeded by: Ricardo Paras

Personal details
- Born: November 27, 1880 Boac, Marinduque, Mindoro, Captaincy General of the Philippines
- Died: July 21, 1951 (aged 70) Manila, Philippines
- Party: Nacionalista

Gregorio María de Nieva y Morente (November 27, 1880 – July 21, 1951) was a Filipino publisher, journalist, businessman, and lawyer. He was a member of the Philippine Assembly from 1909 to 1912 and Philippine House of Representatives from 1916 to 1919, representing Tayabas's 2nd district.

== Early life and career ==
Nieva was born in Boac, Marinduque, on November 27, 1880, to Calixto de Nieva and Epifaña Morente. In his early education, he studied at a Jesuit school in Manila. From 1900, he went abroad and studied in Hong Kong. There, he entered Victoria School and Union College to study English. He returned to the Philippines in July 1901 and entered civil service as a delegate to the provincial treasury of Marinduque. In October that same year, he moved to Manila as a clerk in the Health Office then to the Executive Office. While working as a clerk, he studied law at Escuela de Leyes del Juez Paredes from 1903 to 1907.

In 1906, he was elected Secretary of the Assembly of Provincial Governors held in Manila. In 1907, he was transferred and worked as an assistant clerk to the Property Registry Court. He left that position after the Philippine Assembly was established.

== Philippine Legislature ==
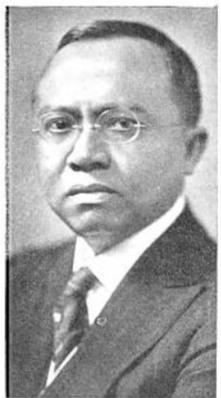
Nieva in 1919

He worked as Assistant Secretary of the Philippine Assembly by Speaker Sergio Osmeña. He was then elected Secretary of the Philippine Assembly after Julian Gerona left the position. In 1908, Nieva was made Secretary of the Second Assembly of Provincial Governors.

He was elected as member to the Second Philippine Assembly in 1909. In 1912, Nieva was appointed private secretary to Speaker Osmeña. During the 2nd Philippine Legislature, he was chairman on the Committees of Public Instruction, Navigation, and Budgets.

Nieva was also an editor and proprietor of the magazine, Philippine Review. He was also a member of the Philippine Independence Mission in 1919. He was editor of the magazine from 1916 to 1922.

== Post-representative career ==
In 1921, he was vice-president for the Philippines of the World Press Congress, which was held in Honolulu, Hawaii. In 1926, he was re-elected in the same congress held in Geneva, Switzerland.

Nieva has been a known contributor to The New York Times, The Outlook, and The Saturday Evening Post. Outside politics, Nieva was one of the founders of the Manila Rotary Club and was president and manager of the Buntal Manufacturing Company.

In 1933, after the approval of the Hilarion Resolution in House of Representatives, Nieva became a technical advisor for the house committee, which the resolution created, that investigates the potential markets of Philippine products to Japan, China, and other Asian countries. He was assigned to handle travel arrangements for delegates and had close contact to the Japanese consulate.

Despite rising tensions between Eastern nations and Japan, Nieva went ahead with the travel arrangements after assurance from Japanese Consul-General Kimura Atsushi.

He died on July 21, 1951, in Manila.

== Works and publications ==
Here are some of Nieva's works and publications:

- Realismo y estadismo (1929)
- La vida en nuestros pueblos (1915)
- The development and progress of the Filipino women (1928)
- Now is the time to solve the Philippine problem (1921)
