= Sariaya =

Municipality in Quezon, Philippines

- Municipality
- Municipality of Sariaya
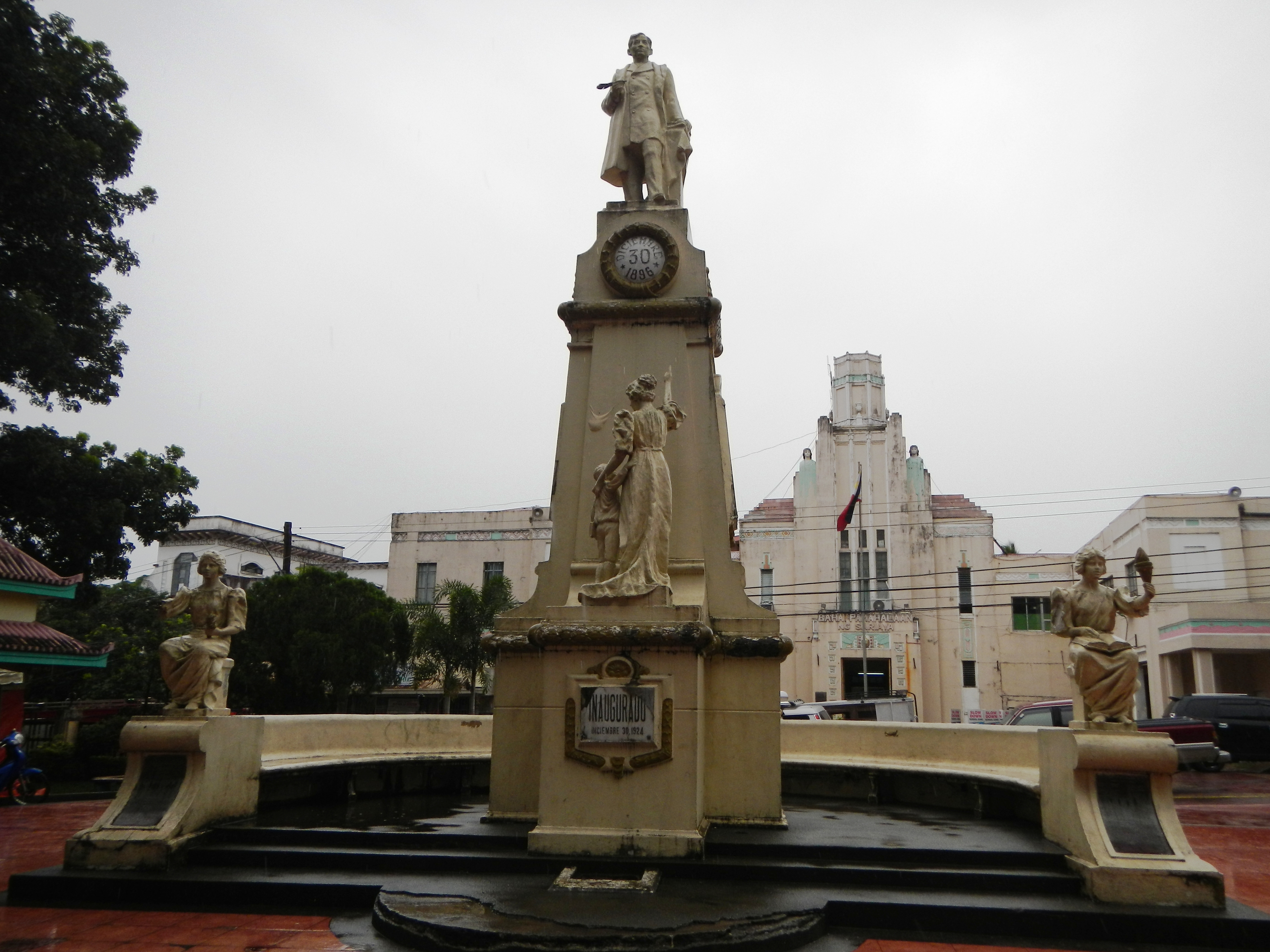
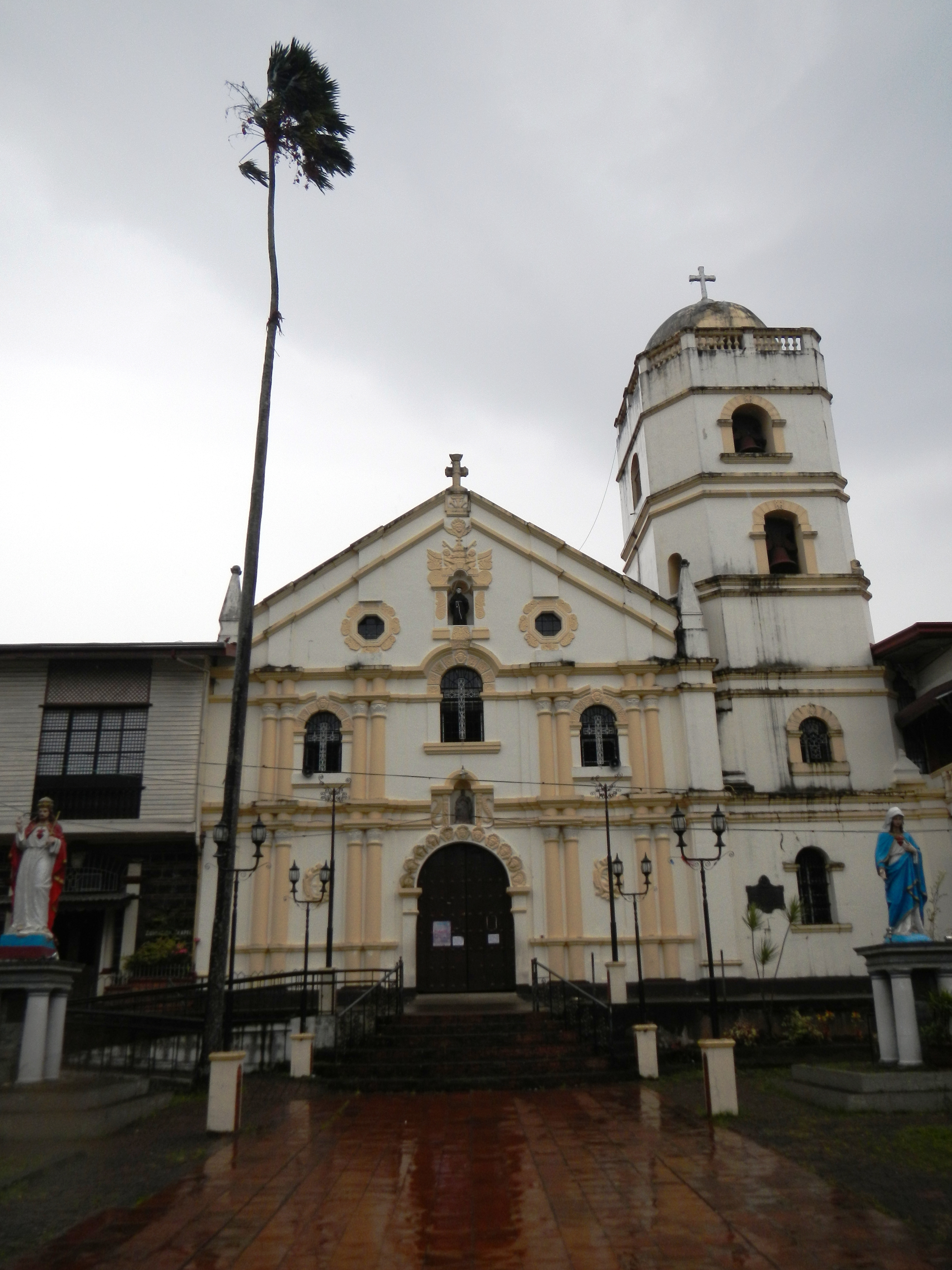
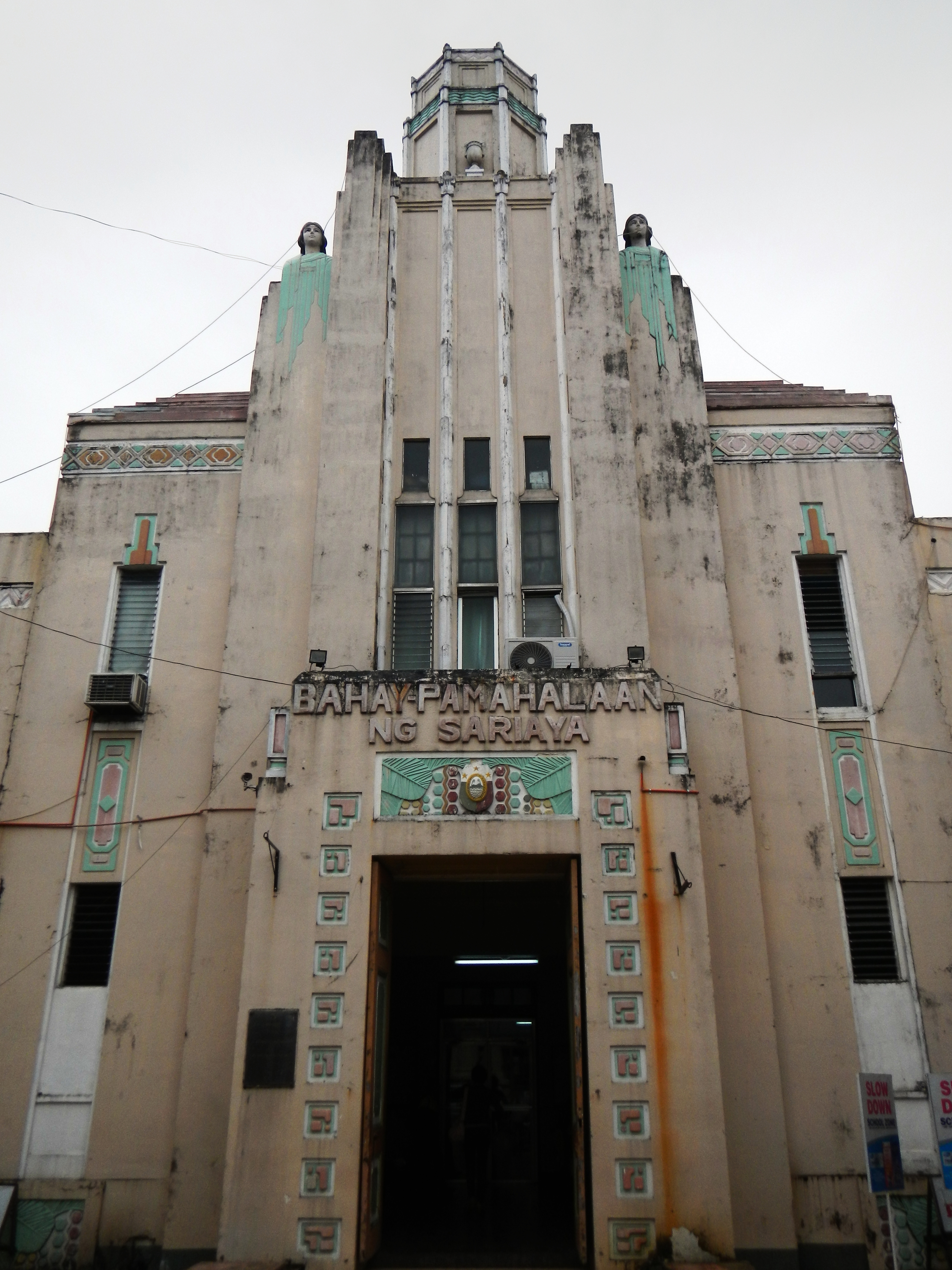
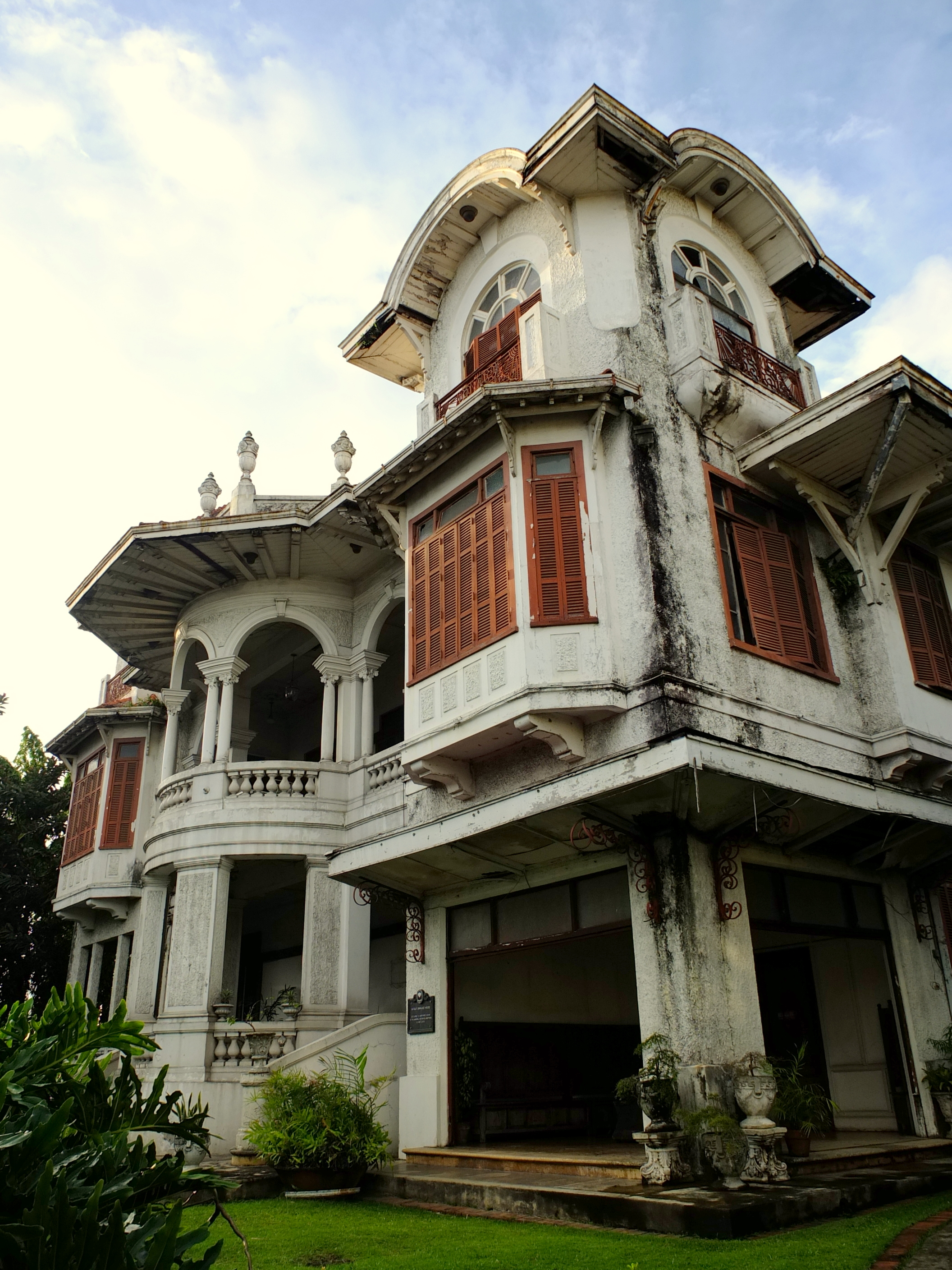
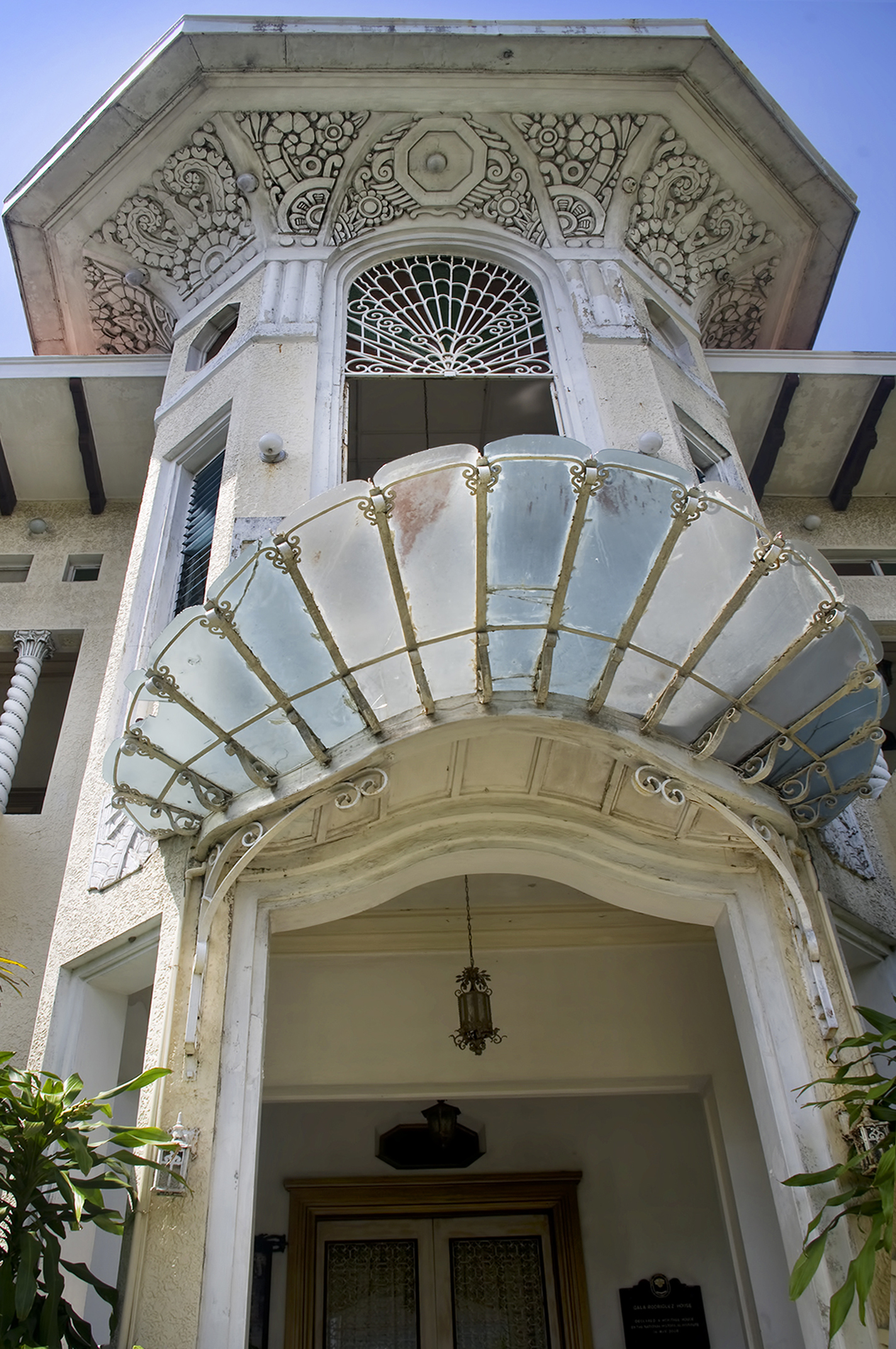
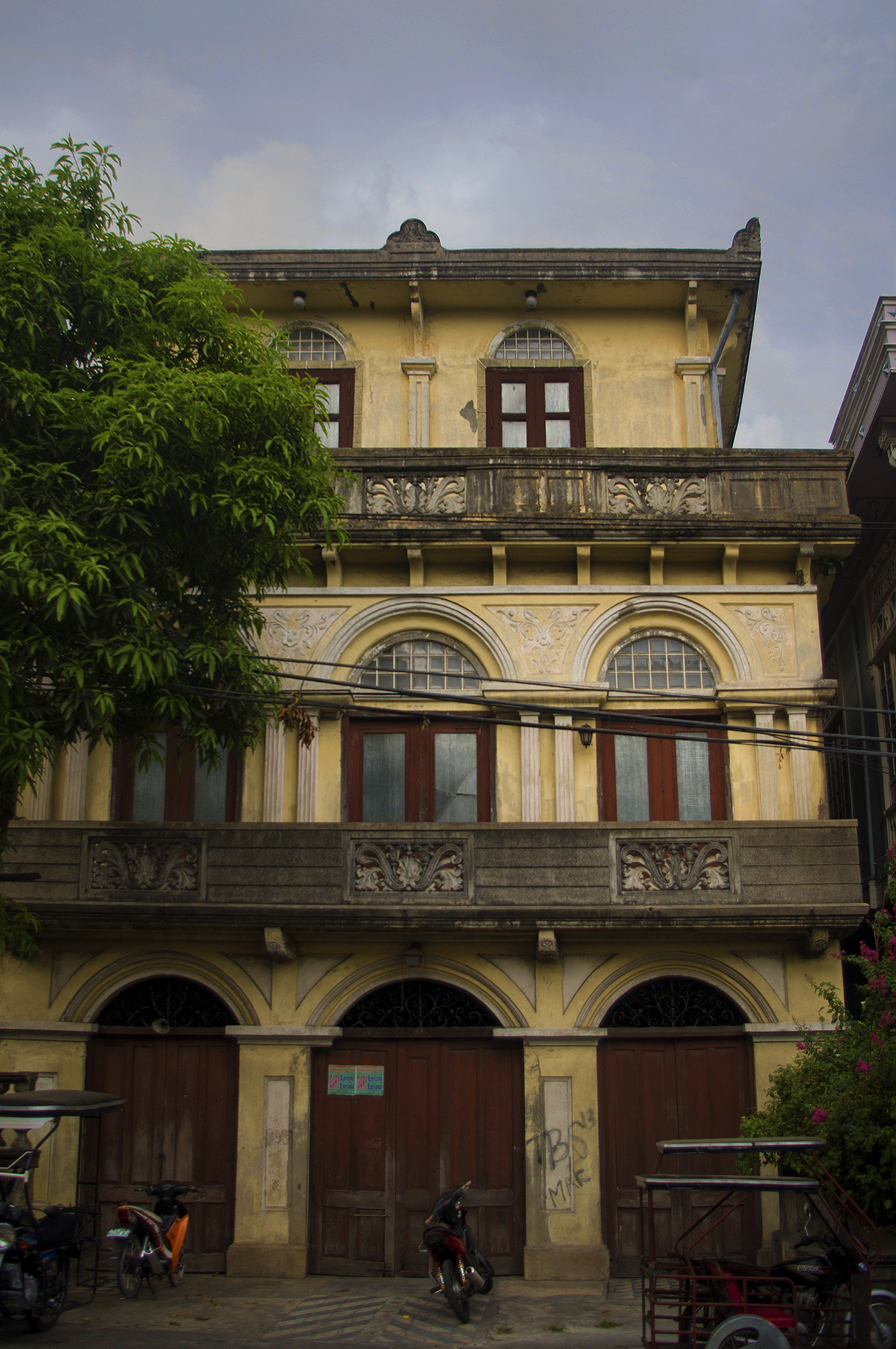
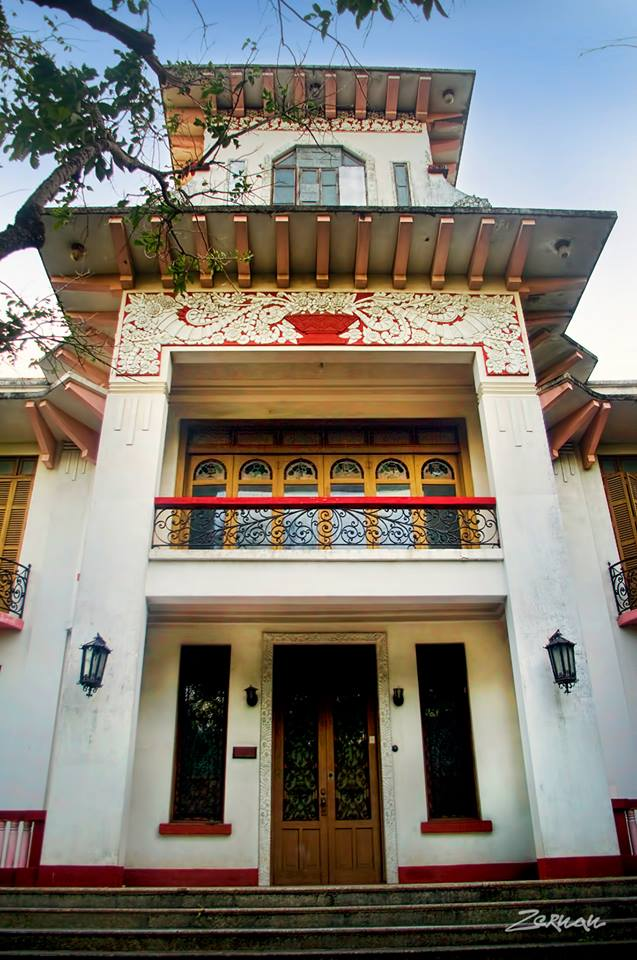
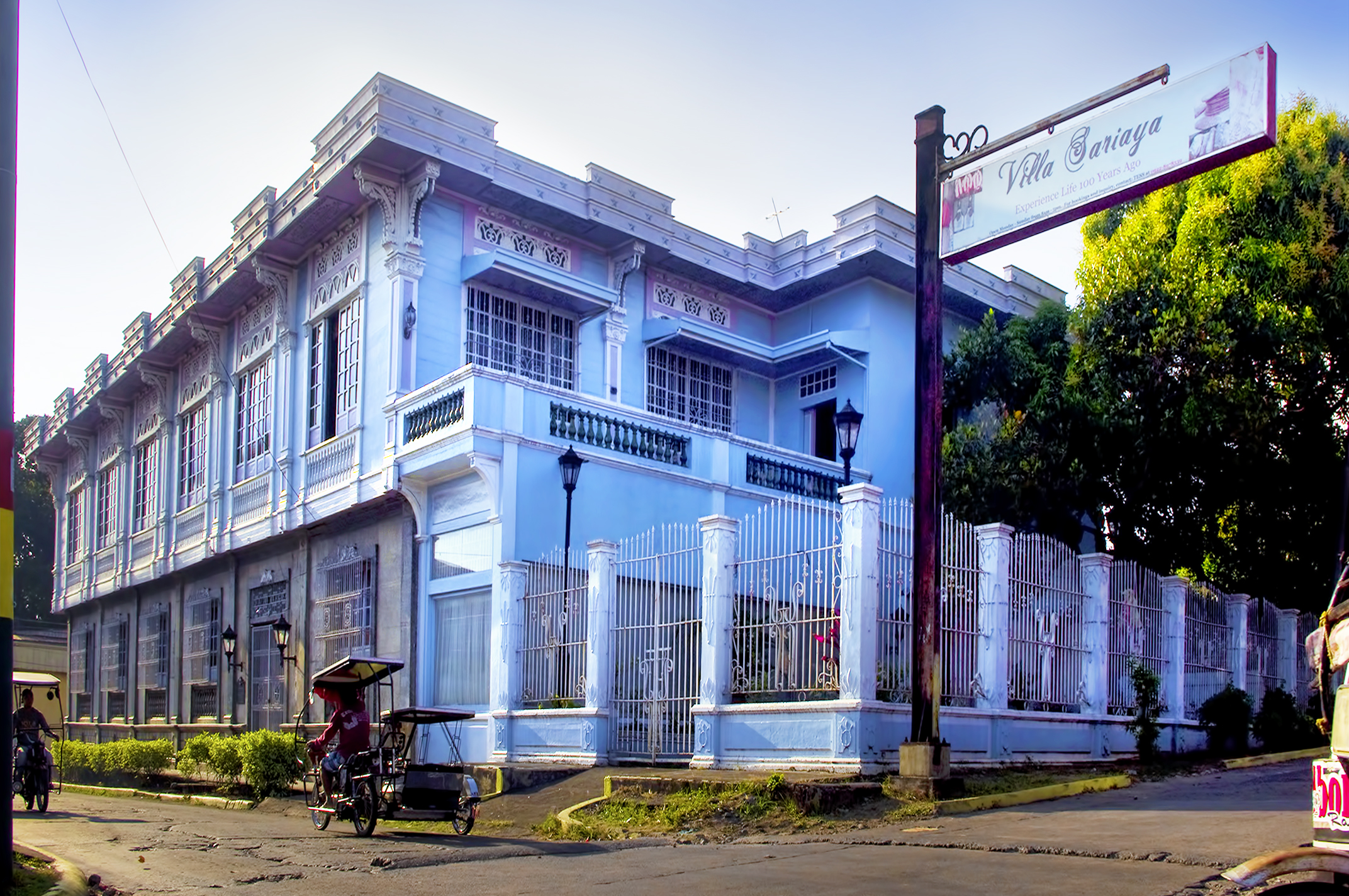
- From L-R: Sariaya Town Plaza, Saint Francis of Assisi Parish Church, Old Sariaya Municipal Building, Governor Natalio Enriquez Ancestral House, Facade of Gala-Rodriguez Ancestral House, Don Lucio Rodriguez Ancestral House, Emralino-Rodriguez Ancestral House, Don Catalino Rodriguez Ancestral House

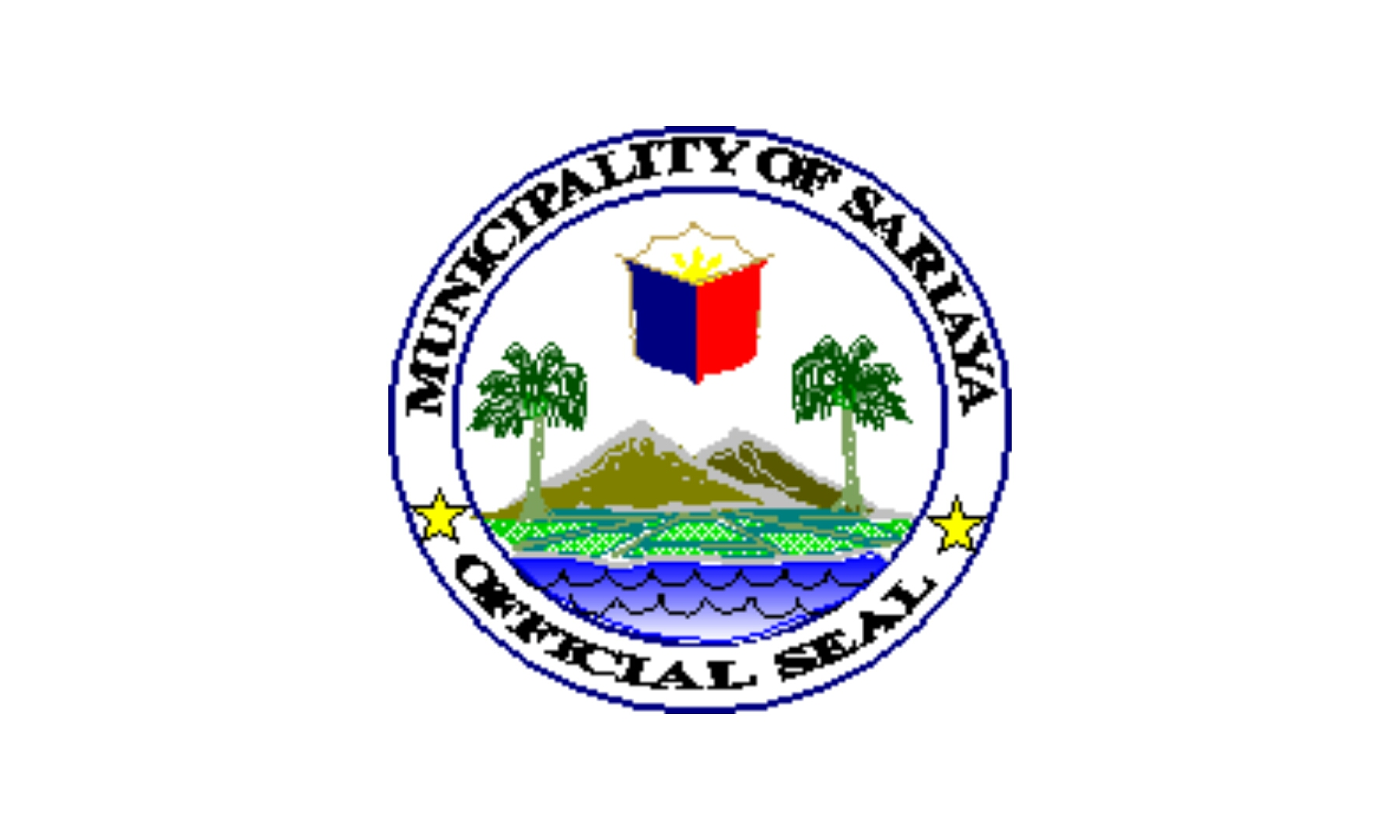
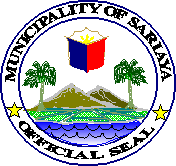
- Flag Seal
- Nicknames: Heritage Town of Quezon; Art Deco Capital of Southern Luzon
- Motto: Gilas Sariaya! (Be valiant Sariaya!)
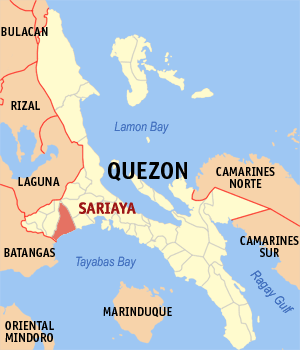
- Map of Quezon with Sariaya highlighted
- Interactive map of Sariaya
- Location within the Philippines
- Coordinates: 13°58′N 121°32′E
- Country: Philippines
- Region: Calabarzon
- Province: Quezon
- District: 2nd district
- Founded: 1599
- Barangays: 43 (see Barangays)

Government
  - Type: Sangguniang Bayan
  - Mayor: Marivic T. Gayeta
  - Vice Mayor: Arlene M. Genove
  - Representative: David C. Suarez
  - Municipal Council: Members: Joel N. Cambel; Vince Rudolph E. Alcala; Renz Kevin E. Marucap; Arvin M. Genove; Minerva R. Remo; Teodorico C. De La Peña; Ryan C. Decena; Jayson M. Obnasca
  - Electorate: 105,746 voters (2025)

Area
  - Total: 212.16 km^{2} (81.92 sq mi)
  - Rank: 17th out of 41 in Quezon
- Elevation: 139 m (456 ft)
- Highest elevation: 2,167 m (7,110 ft)
- Lowest elevation: 0 m (0 ft)

Population (2024 census)
  - Total: 172,018
  - Rank: 1st out 39 municipalities in Quezon; 17th out of 1,493 municipalities in the Philippines
  - Density: 810.79/km^{2} (2,099.9/sq mi)
  - Households: 39,329
- Demonym: Sariayahin

Economy
  - Income class: 1st municipal income class
  - Poverty incidence: 3.77% (2023)
  - Revenue: ₱ 646.3 million (2024)
  - Assets: ₱ 1,639 million (2024)
  - Expenditure: ₱ 333.5 million (2024)
  - Liabilities: ₱ 637.2 million (2024)

Service provider
  - Electricity: Manila Electric Company (Meralco)
- Time zone: UTC+8 (PST)
- ZIP code: 4322
- PSGC: 0405645000
- IDD : area code: +63 (0)42
- Native languages: Tagalog
- Website: sariaya.gov.ph

Sariaya ([sɐɾˈjajɐ]), officially the Municipality of Sariaya (Tagalog: Bayan ng Sariaya), is a municipality in the province of Quezon, Philippines. According to the 2024 census, it has a population of 172,018 people, making it the second most populous local government unit (LGU) in Quezon after the capital city of Lucena, and the most populous municipality in the said province.

As the only Mount Banahaw town in both Quezon and Laguna Provinces that has a sea coast, the town is famous for its pristine beach resorts and nature-trekking activities that lead adventurous hikers to the peak of mythical Mount Banahaw. With more than a hundred of cultural properties and ancestral houses mostly built in Art Deco architecture within the municipality, Sariaya is considered as the Heritage Town of Quezon and the Art Deco Capital of Southern Luzon. This heritage town has been branded by various cultural experts as a 'cultural gem worthy of a UNESCO designation.' The local government of the municipality with the National Commission for Culture and the Arts of the Philippines were designated to work for the heritage town's inclusion in the UNESCO World Heritage List.

== Etymology ==
The origin of the word Sariaya was allegedly came from the word Sadyaya — one of the town's numerous rivers, but words of the great ancestors and legends have it that it was named after Saria, a supposedly 'illiterate' (according to the Spanish) woman who encountered the first Spaniards in the town who were asking the name of the settlement. Saria could not understand the question as it was in Spanish, which was foreign and unknown to everyone in the area during that time. She was thus branded as illiterate by the Spanish despite being highly educated through Tagalog traditional knowledge.

The woman gave her name as answer to the Spanish, assuming that they were asking her name. The Spaniards wrote "Saria" on their notebooks as the name of the settlement. And while the Spaniards were talking with each other, the natives heard them utter the words "Saria-ya". Hence, the words traveled from mouth to mouth and became a common saying until the two words were combined.

== History ==
The beginning of Sariaya's documented history occurred with the arrival of Augustinian missionary priests in a Tagalog seaside settlement in what is now Barangay Castañas on the shores of Tayabas Bay. They discovered a thriving native people and converted the majority of them to Christianity.

After years of being part of Tayabas, Sariaya became a separate town in 1631 and was transferred northwards to avoid Moro pirates.

A strong earthquake in 1743 caused the bell tower of the Tumbaga church to collapse. As a result, the fragile southwest ridge of Mount Banahaw's crater lake collapsed, destroying the ancient community referred to as "Lumangbayan," or Old Town. The surviving settlers relocated further north. A more durable combination of materials was used in the construction of the current church. These components consist of bricks, adobe blocks, albumin or egg white, stones, and masonry. In addition to being a house of worship, the church and its four-story belfry served as a lookout point for the surrounding fields and mountains as well as a citadel or last line of defense for the residents.

On May 17, 1902, Candelaria was merged with Sariaya by virtue of Act No. 402. On September 20, 1907, Candelaria was separated from the municipality to regain its independent status.

== Geography ==
Sariaya is an inland municipality in the province of Quezon, located 120 kilometers (75 mi) south of Metro Manila and 10 kilometers (6.2 mi) from the provincial capital Lucena. The municipality is bordered by Tayabas on north-east side, Lucena on its southeast, the municipality of Candelaria on its west, and the town of San Juan in Batangas on its south-west. Mount Banahaw flanks it on the north and Tayabas Bay on the south side. It has a total land area of 24,530 hectares (60,600 acres).

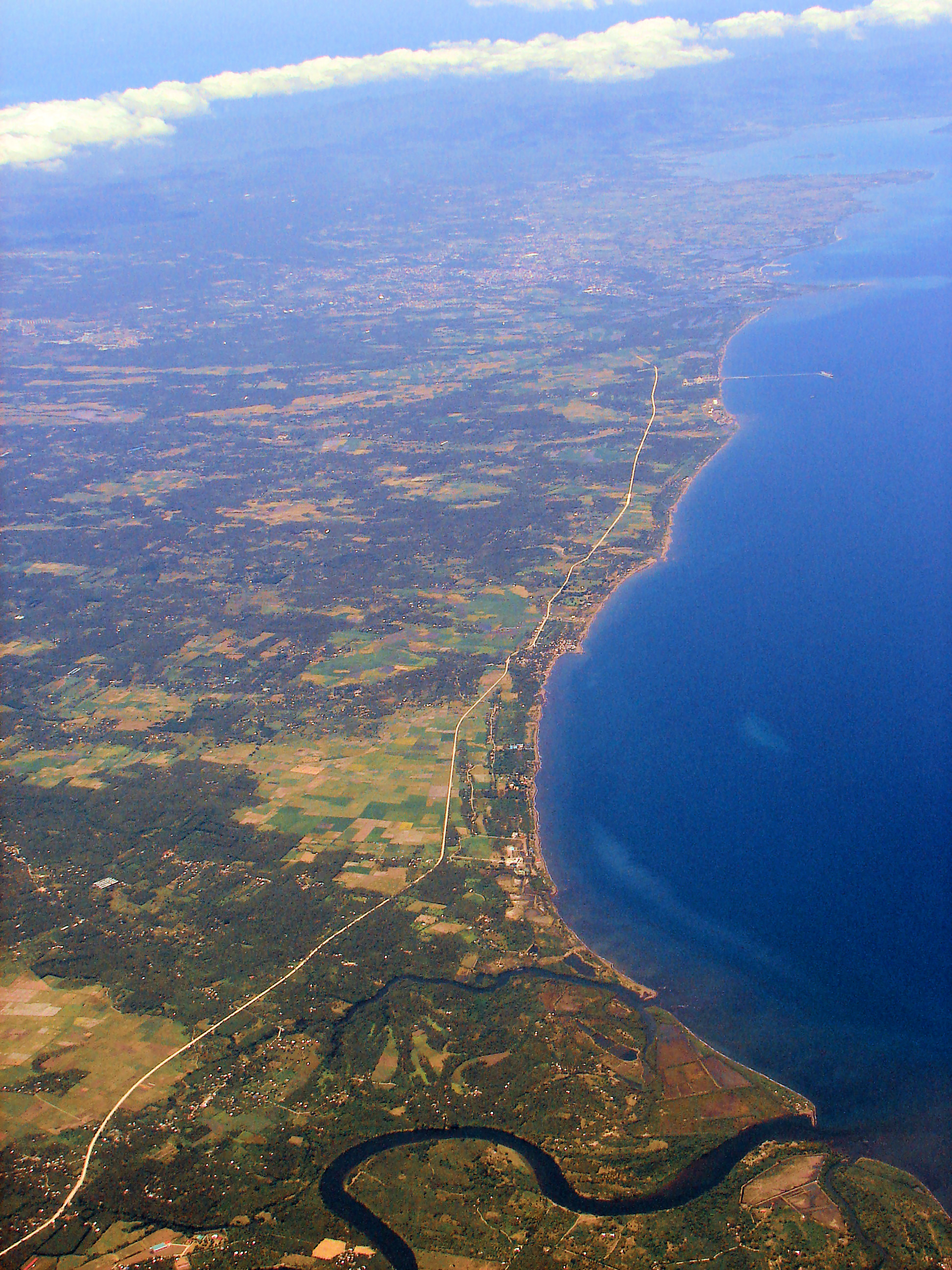
Aerial view of Sariaya's coast with Lucena in the background.

=== Barangays ===
Sariaya is politically subdivided into 43 barangays, as indicated in the matrix below. Each barangay consists of puroks and some have sitios.

Currently, six barangays are urban barangays located at the Poblacion, one barangay is classified as sub-urban and six barangays are coastal barangays.

Hereunder is the list of Barangays in Municipality of Sariaya and its land area:

| Barangay | Land Area (Ha) | Area Rank | Population (2020) | Classification |
|---|---|---|---|---|
| Antipolo | 490.60 | 27.5 | 1,888 | Rural |
| Balubal | 560.68 | 19 | 5,304 | Rural |
| Bignay 1 | 630.80 | 15 | 6,105 | Rural |
| Bignay 2 | 728.90 | 10 | 3,857 | Rural |
| Bucal | 518.63 | 23.5 | 3,408 | Rural |
| Canda | 588.71 | 18 | 3,052 | Rural |
| Castañas | 876.10 | 8 | 7,120 | Rural |
| Concepcion 1 | 827.00 | 9 | 5,764 | Rural |
| Concepcion Banahaw | 1,345.00 | 2 | 3,411 | Rural |
| Concepcion Palasan | 939.14 | 6 | 7,680 | Rural |
| Concepcion Pinagbakuran | 714.90 | 11 | 3,050 | Rural |
| Gibanga | 546.70 | 21 | 3,752 | Rural |
| Guisguis San Roque | 448.54 | 29.5 | 2,645 | Rural |
| Guisguis Talon | 530.65 | 22 | 4,376 | Rural |
| Janagdong 1 | 518.63 | 23.5 | 3,935 | Rural |
| Janagdong 2 | 672.80 | 12.5 | 3,242 | Rural |
| Limbon | 280.34 | 36 | 1,428 | Rural |
| Lutucan 1 | 392.50 | 34 | 4,961 | Rural |
| Lutucan Bata | 490.60 | 27.5 | 2,498 | Rural |
| Lutucan Malabag | 497.60 | 26 | 4,847 | Rural |
| Mamala 1 | 441.07 | 32 | 3,187 | Rural |
| Mamala 2 | 442.00 | 31 | 6,016 | Sub-Urban |
| Manggalang 1 | 1,198.43 | 3 | 6,966 | Rural |
| Manggalang Bantilan | 672.80 | 12.5 | 4,073 | Rural |
| Manggalang Kiling | 616.85 | 17 | 3,125 | Rural |
| Manggalang Tulo-Tulo | 623.80 | 16 | 3,209 | Rural |
| Montecillo | 658.79 | 14 | 4,271 | Rural |
| Morong | 434.53 | 33 | 2,098 | Rural |
| Pili | 448.54 | 29.5 | 4,196 | Rural |
| Barangay 1 (Pob.) | 8.5 | 40 | 1,867 | Urban |
| Barangay 2 (Pob.) | 14.5 | 39 | 1,206 | Urban |
| Barangay 3 (Pob.) | 7.0 | 42 | 1,184 | Urban |
| Barangay 4 (Pob.) | 16.60 | 38 | 3,545 | Urban |
| Barangay 5 (Pob.) | 7.5 | 41 | 1,037 | Urban |
| Barangay 6 (Pob.) | 6.0 | 43 | 1,207 | Urban |
| Sampaloc 1 | 1,037.26 | 4 | 2,603 | Rural |
| Sampaloc 2 | 1,023.24 | 5 | 6,862 | Rural |
| Sampaloc Bogon | 1,675.03 | 1 | 1,255 | Rural |
| Sampaloc Santo Cristo | 911.11 | 7 | 9,007 | Rural |
| Talaan Aplaya | 553.67 | 20 | 3,011 | Rural |
| Talaan Pantoc | 273.33 | 37 | 2,322 | Rural |
| Tumbaga 1 | 518.63 | 23.5 | 4,903 | Rural |
| Tumbaga 2 | 336.41 | 35 | 1,936 | Rural |

=== Topography ===
Sariaya is situated on a flat land except for a portion on the north occupying a part of the foot of Mount Banahaw. The municipality has the highest point of elevation on 3,800 feet (1,200 m) above sea level at Barangays Concepcion Banahaw and Sampaloc Bogon.

=== Climate ===
Climate data for Sariaya
| Month | Jan | Feb | Mar | Apr | May | Jun | Jul | Aug | Sep | Oct | Nov | Dec | Year |
|---|---|---|---|---|---|---|---|---|---|---|---|---|---|
| Mean daily maximum °C (°F) | 28 (82) | 28 (82) | 30 (86) | 32 (90) | 32 (90) | 32 (90) | 31 (88) | 31 (88) | 31 (88) | 30 (86) | 29 (84) | 30 (86) | 30 (87) |
| Mean daily minimum °C (°F) | 22 (72) | 22 (72) | 23 (73) | 24 (75) | 24 (75) | 24 (75) | 24 (75) | 24 (75) | 23 (73) | 23 (73) | 23 (73) | 23 (73) | 23 (74) |
| Average rainfall mm (inches) | 92 (3.6) | 55 (2.2) | 46 (1.8) | 62 (2.4) | 117 (4.6) | 184 (7.2) | 211 (8.3) | 211 (8.3) | 233 (9.2) | 320 (12.6) | 323 (12.7) | 263 (10.4) | 2,117 (83.3) |
Source: World Weather Online

Sariaya falls under Type III of the PAGASA's climatic classification system this is because it is situated on the southern portion of the province's mountain ranges characterized by seasons not very pronounced, relatively dry from December to April and wet during the rest of the year. The maximum rain periods are not very pronounced with the short dry season lasting from two to four months.

== Demographics ==
Population census of Sariaya
| Year | Pop. | ±% p.a. |
|---|---|---|
| 1903 | 12,453 | — |
| 1918 | 14,158 | +0.86% |
| 1939 | 25,736 | +2.89% |
| 1948 | 29,904 | +1.68% |
| 1960 | 42,089 | +2.89% |
| 1970 | 58,997 | +3.43% |
| 1975 | 66,847 | +2.54% |
| 1980 | 74,148 | +2.09% |
| 1990 | 91,081 | +2.08% |
| 1995 | 100,709 | +1.90% |
| 2000 | 114,568 | +2.80% |
| 2007 | 128,248 | +1.57% |
| 2010 | 138,894 | +2.94% |
| 2015 | 148,980 | +1.34% |
| 2020 | 161,868 | +1.76% |
| 2024 | 172,018 | +1.47% |
Source: Philippine Statistics Authority

According to the 2020 census of population, Sariaya has a total population of 161,868 people making the second most populous area in Quezon after Lucena. Barangay Santo Cristo is the most populous area in Sariaya with a total population of 9,007 people according to the 2020 census, The Poblacion ranks second and Concepcion Palasan placed in the third rank.

== Economy ==
Poverty incidence of Sariaya (%)

Source: Philippine Statistics Authority

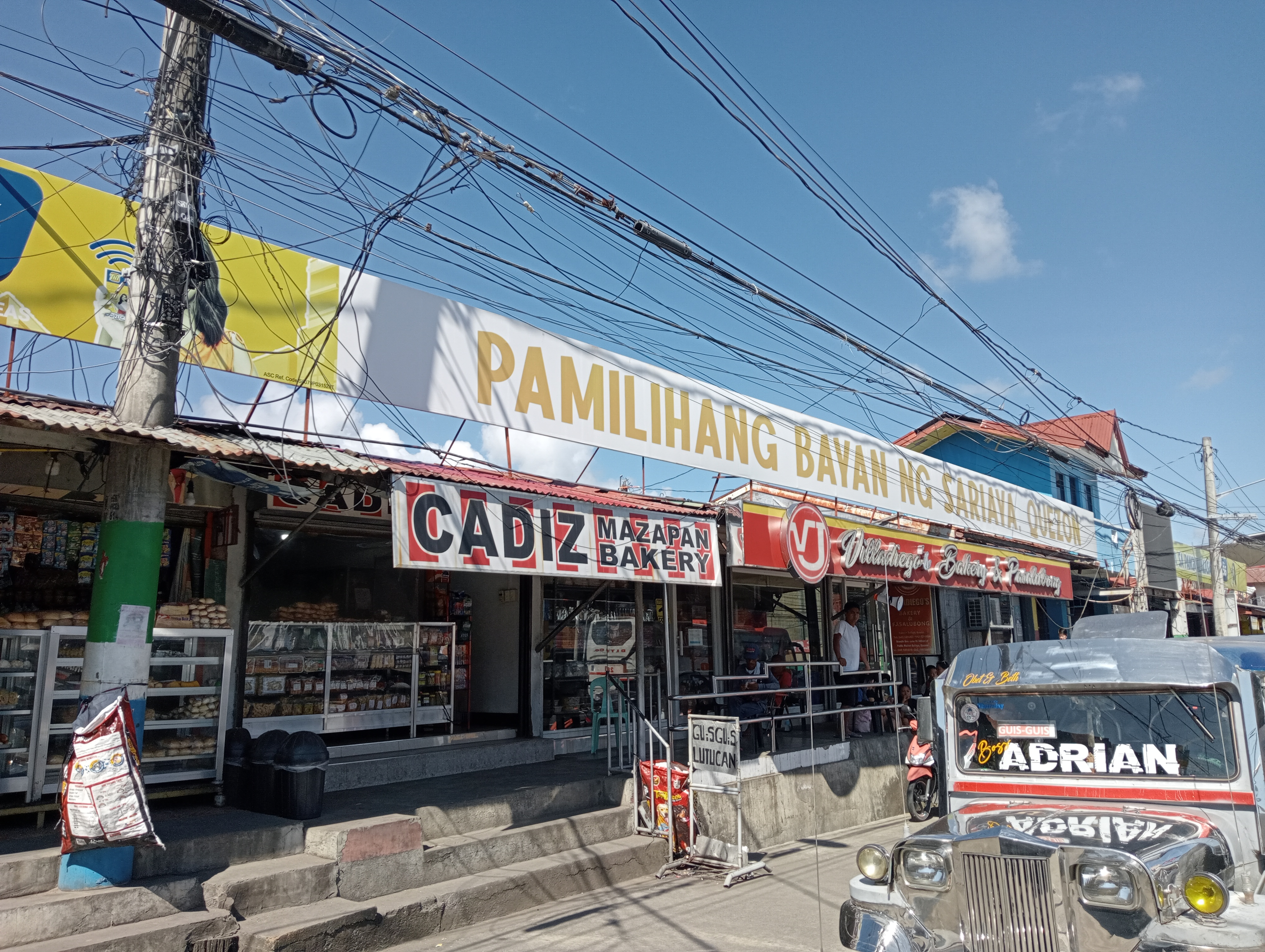
Sariaya Public Market

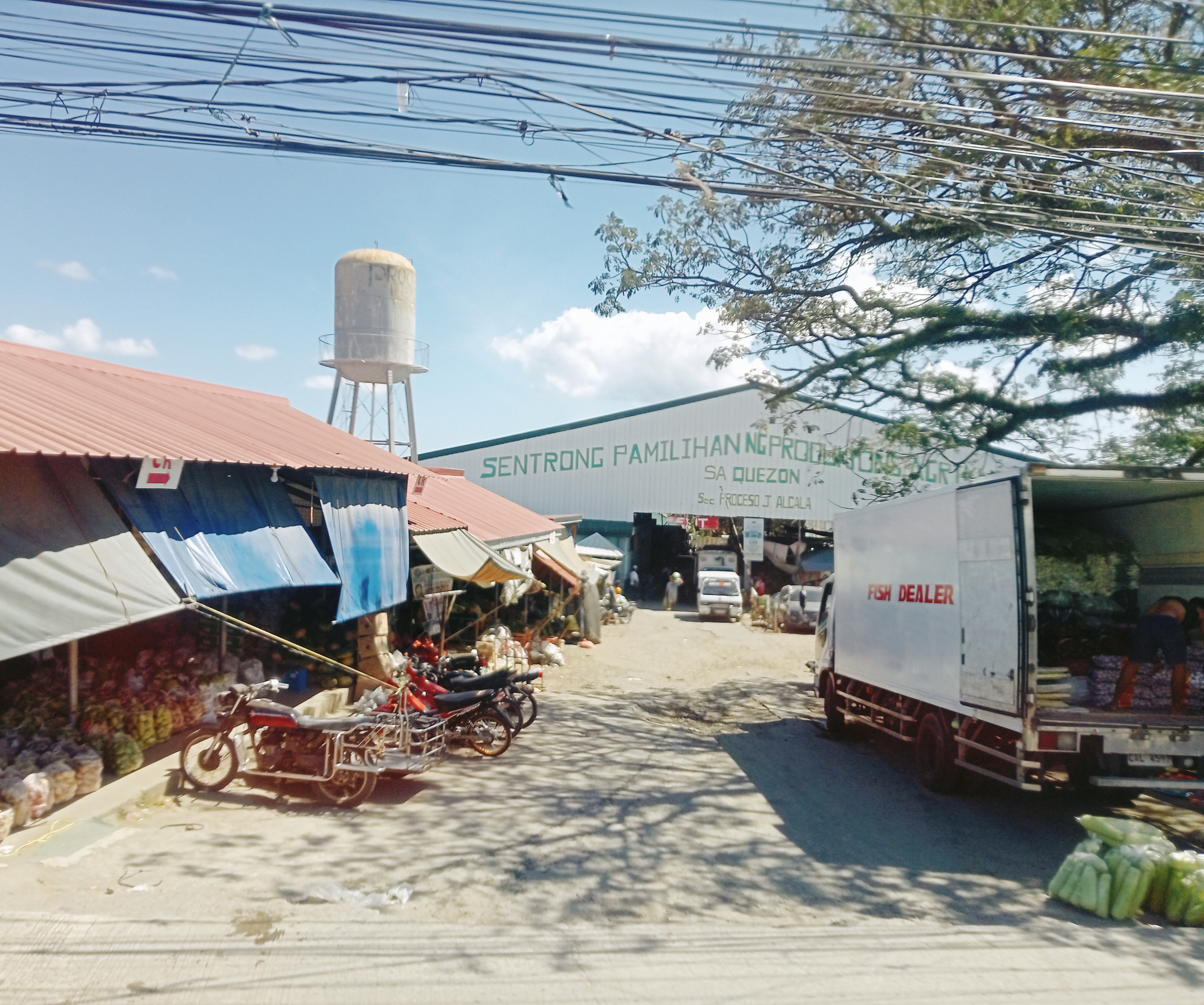
Sentrong Pamilihan ng Produktong Agrikultura sa Quezon

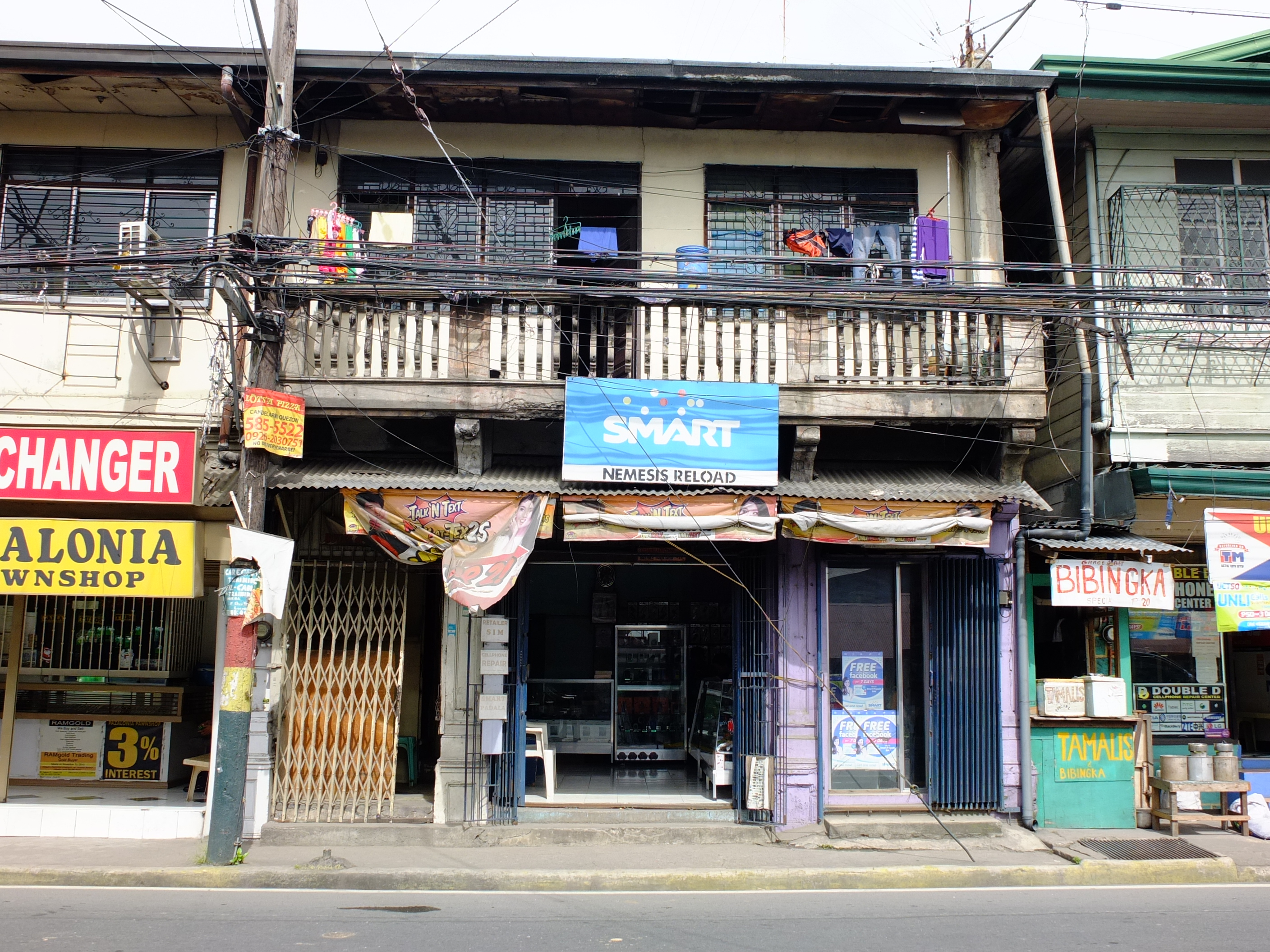
Stores along the Sariaya's Business District

=== Commerce ===
The trade and commerce in Sariaya is heavily concentrated at General Luna Street (Maharlika Highway), which is the town's central business district where majority of the town's commercial establishments are situated such as retail, supermarkets, banks, drugstores, bakeries, merchandising, grocery, hardware, fastfood chains, shopping center, convenience stores and others.

=== Income ===
Agriculture is one of the major sources of income in Sariaya. According to the 2016 Competitiveness Index of the National Competitiveness Council or NCC, the municipality belongs to the Top 50 most competitive municipalities in the Philippines. According to the annual Audit Report of Commission on Audit (COA), Sariaya is also one of Quezon's top grossing municipalities when factoring annual income.

The table below shows the list of the total annual income, assets, expenses and equity of Sariaya since 2008:

| Year | Total Income (COA). | Assets | Expenses | Equity |
|---|---|---|---|---|
| 2008 | ₱139.37 million | ₱141.48 million | ₱112.92 million | ₱101.17 million |
| 2009 | ₱154.89 million ▲ | ₱198.33 million ▲ | ₱141.55 million ▲ | ₱109.66 million ▲ |
| 2010 | ₱164.55 million ▲ | ₱202.63 million ▲ | ₱158.44 million ▲ | ₱101.71 million ▼ |
| 2011 | ₱183.43 million ▲ | ₱243.13 million ▲ | ₱172.08 million ▲ | ₱106.77 million ▲ |
| 2012 | ₱183.59 million ▲ | ₱237.29 ▼ | ₱181.60 million ▲ | ₱112.67 million ▲ |
| 2013 | ₱212.08 million ▲ | ₱239.29 million ▲ | ₱200.54 million ▲ | ₱117.99 million ▲ |
| 2014 | ₱243.73 million ▲ | ₱390.88 million ▲ | ₱206.07 million ▲ | ₱152.49 million ▲ |
| 2015 | ₱275.70 million ▲ | ₱467.81 million ▲ | ₱248.83 million ▲ | ₱176.53 million ▲ |

== Culture ==
==== Agawan Festival ====
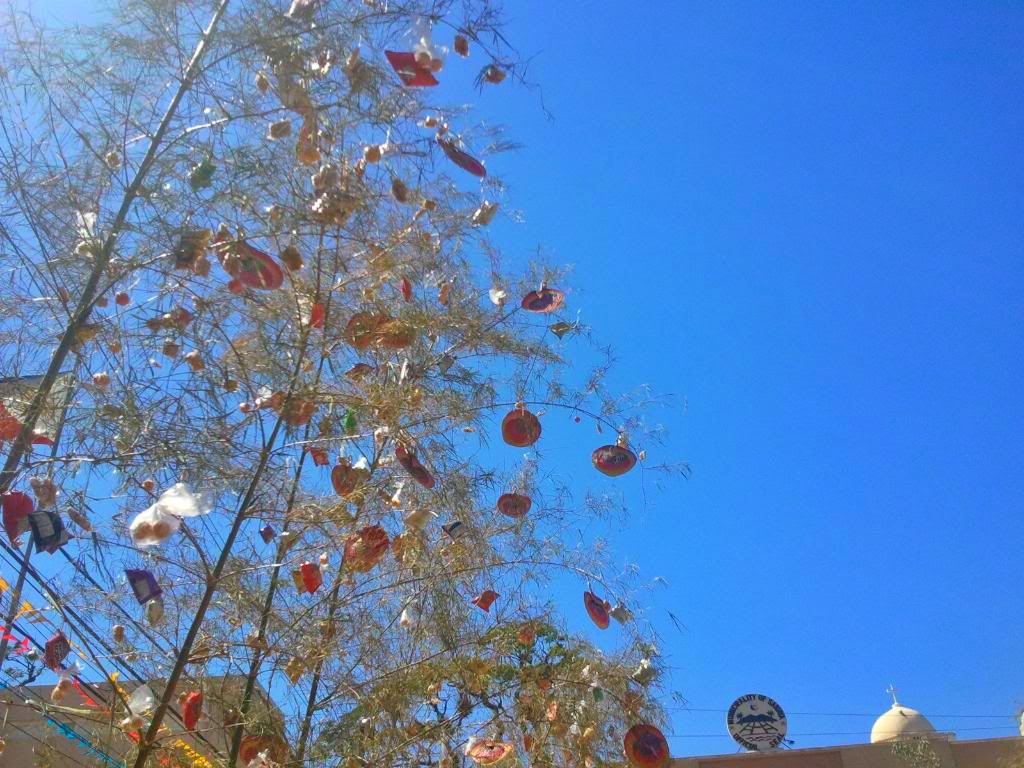
Bagakays

Celebrated every May 15, this religious festivity pays tribute to San Isidro Labrador, the patron saint of farmers. This much-anticipated feast has close affinity with the 'Pahiyas Festival' of Lucban, Quezon. Pliant bamboo treetops and trellises (bagakay) weighed down by succulent fruits, native candies, rice cakes, and colorful rice krispies called "kiping" are deliberately pulled down on the streets by noisy merrymakers right after the afternoon procession. Festival revelers from the town's barangays, neighboring towns, and other provinces would then scramble to gather as many treats as they can snatch and carry, hence the term "Agawan."

Town Fiesta

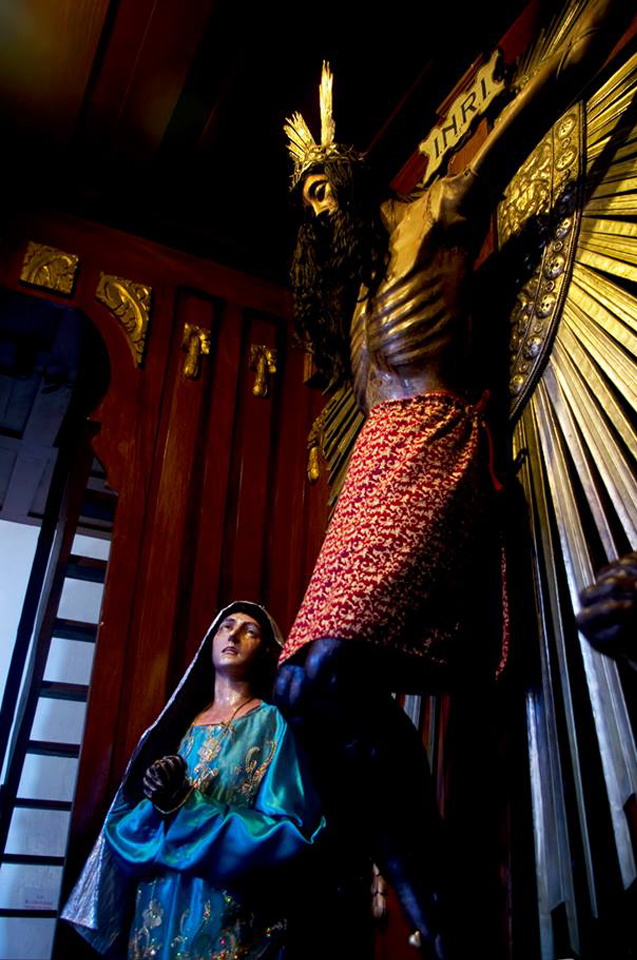
Santo Cristo de Burgos

On September 14, pious devotees from far and wide pay homage to the miraculous image of the Santo Cristo de Burgos during the Feast of the Exaltation of the Cross. The Catholic feast is a day-long veneration of the replica of the Crucified Christ at the ancient Cathedral of Burgos, Spain long believed to be a gift of King Philip V of Spain in 1703 to the people of Lumangbayan in Sariaya. People from far-flung barangays flock to the Poblacion to attend the packed fiesta Masses. They also sell their farm products and handicrafts in the public market as they sample the decorated and crowded venue for the annual "perya" (fiesta fair) for rides, occasional circus performances, and shows featuring human mutants, trained animals performing tricks, vendors peddling herbal medicines, and "peryantes," hardy and itinerant peddlers of cheap clothing, toys, and kitchen utensils. The town's basketball tournament also holds its cherished championship game on the eve of this much-awaited day. Sometimes there are hired stage performances at the town plaza that feature some of the nation's stage, television and film celebrities as well as musical stars.

== Government ==
=== Elected officials ===
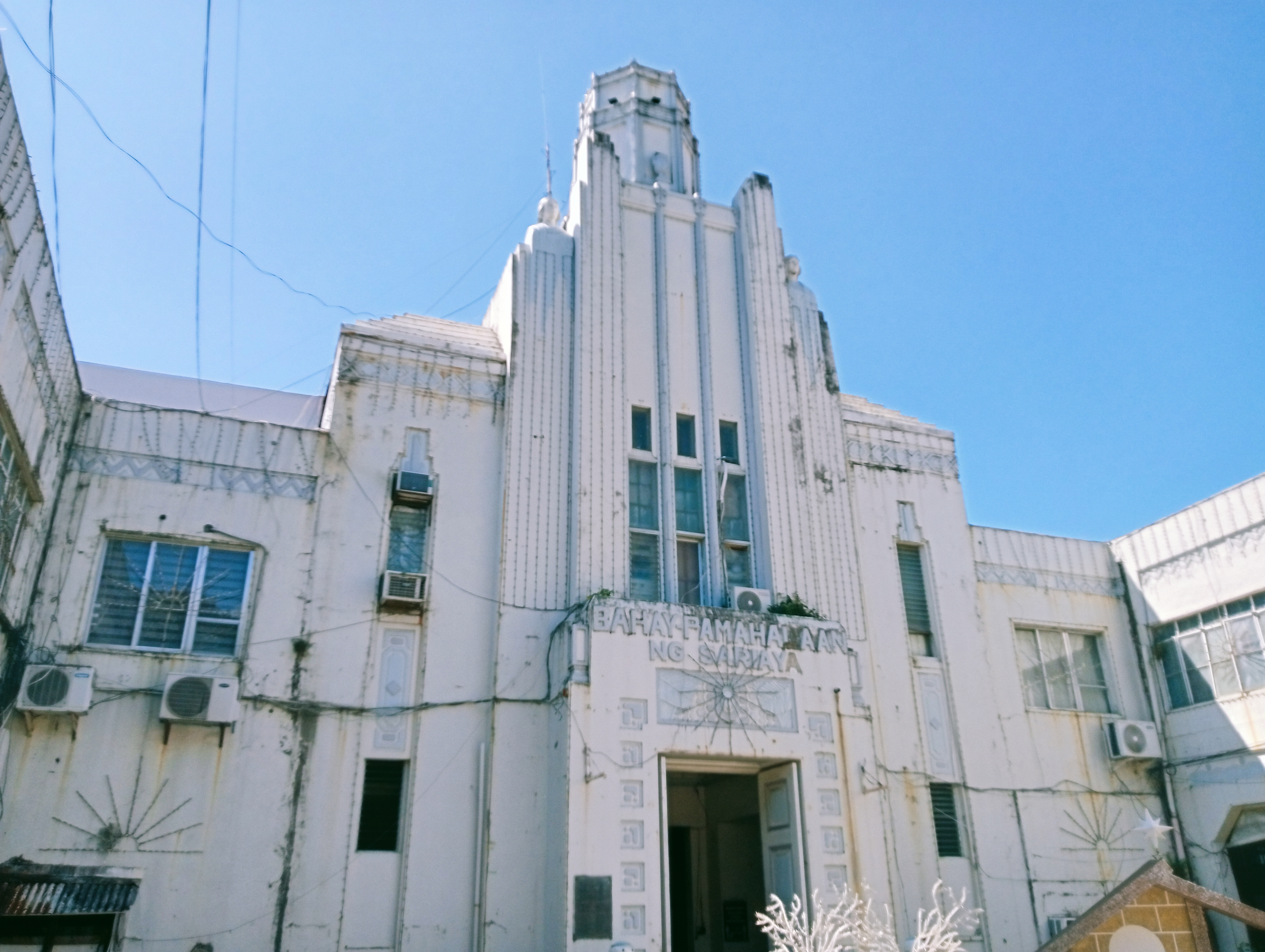
Sariaya Municipal Building

Elected officials for the 2019–2022 term are:

Members of the Sariaya Municipal Council (2022–present)
| Position | Name |
|---|---|
| Mayor | Marcelo "Marcing" P. Gayeta |
| Vice Mayor | Alexander A. Tolentino |
| Councilors | Arlene Genove |
| Councilors | Demia Perez- Maghirang |
| Councilors | Vince Alcala Banta |
| Councilors | Renz Marcuap |
| Councilors | Minerva “Miner” Remo |
| Councilors | Ofelia C. Villapando |
| Councilors | Haidee Medina- Caringal |
| Councilors | Mario Medina Medrano |

== Infrastructure ==
=== Transportation ===
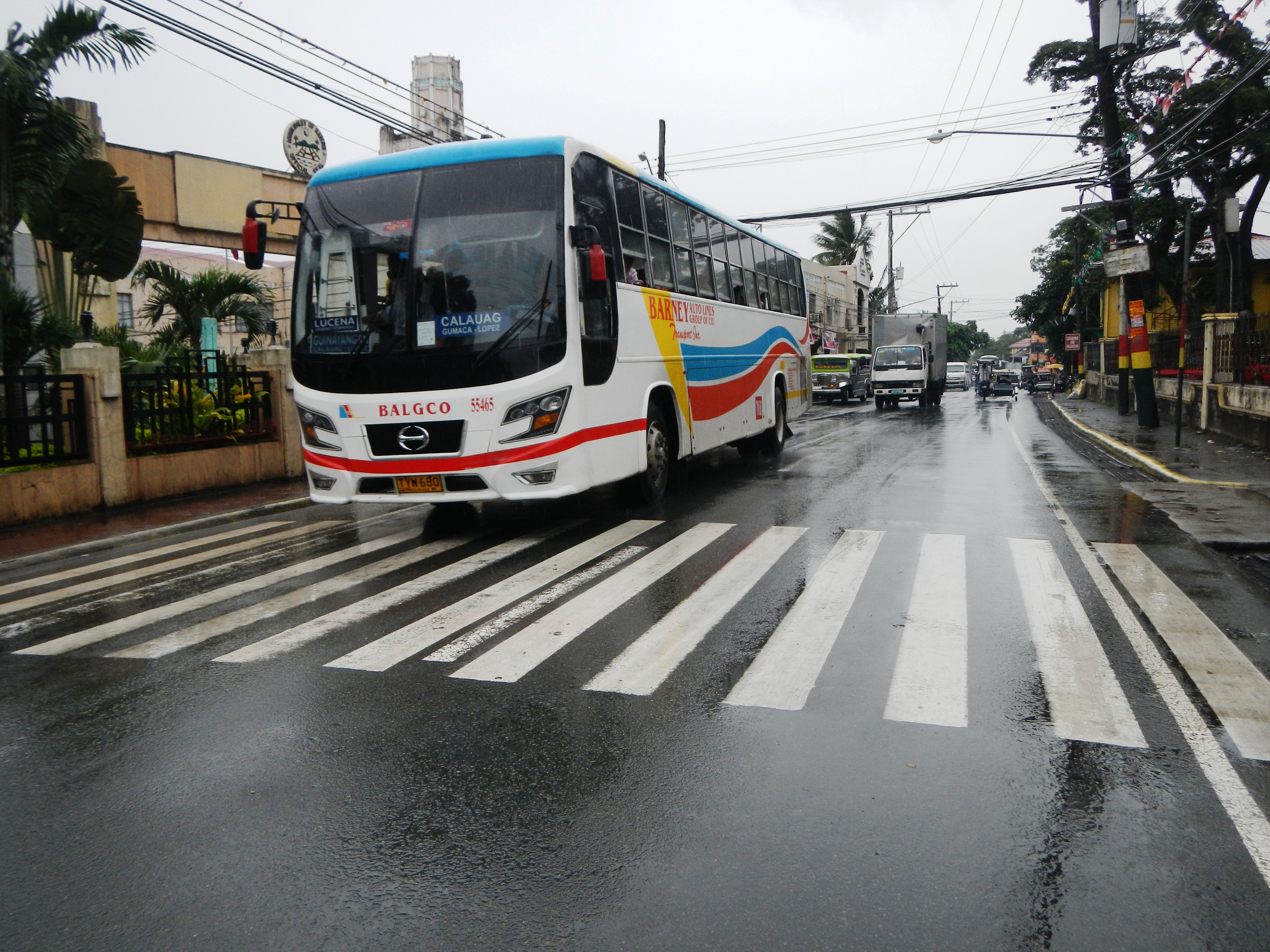
Maharlika Highway, locally known as General Luna Street, at the town proper

Sariaya is traversed by the Maharlika Highway (N1), which passes through the town proper as the congested General Luna Street, and the newer Quezon Eco-Tourism Road (N422) which passes through the municipality's coastal areas. New highways will be South Luzon Expressway (SLEX) Toll Road 4, which will have one exit west of town proper, and the Sariaya Bypass Road, which is being built to decongest Maharlika Highway through the town center.

Buses between Manila, Lucena, and Bicol stop at Sariaya town proper, and jeepneys provide short-distance transportation to nearby towns. Tricycles are used to travel between barangays.

=== Communication ===
Sariaya is served by landline and mobile phone companies like the General Telephone System, Inc. (GTSi) and Digitel Telecommunications (PLDT-Digitel) as the main telecommunication services providers in the municipality. Major mobile phone providers in the area includes Globe Telecom, Smart Communications, and Dito Telecommunity. Also, Sariaya has a cable provider which is the Sariaya Cable Network.

== Tourism ==
=== Saint Francis of Assisi Parish Church ===
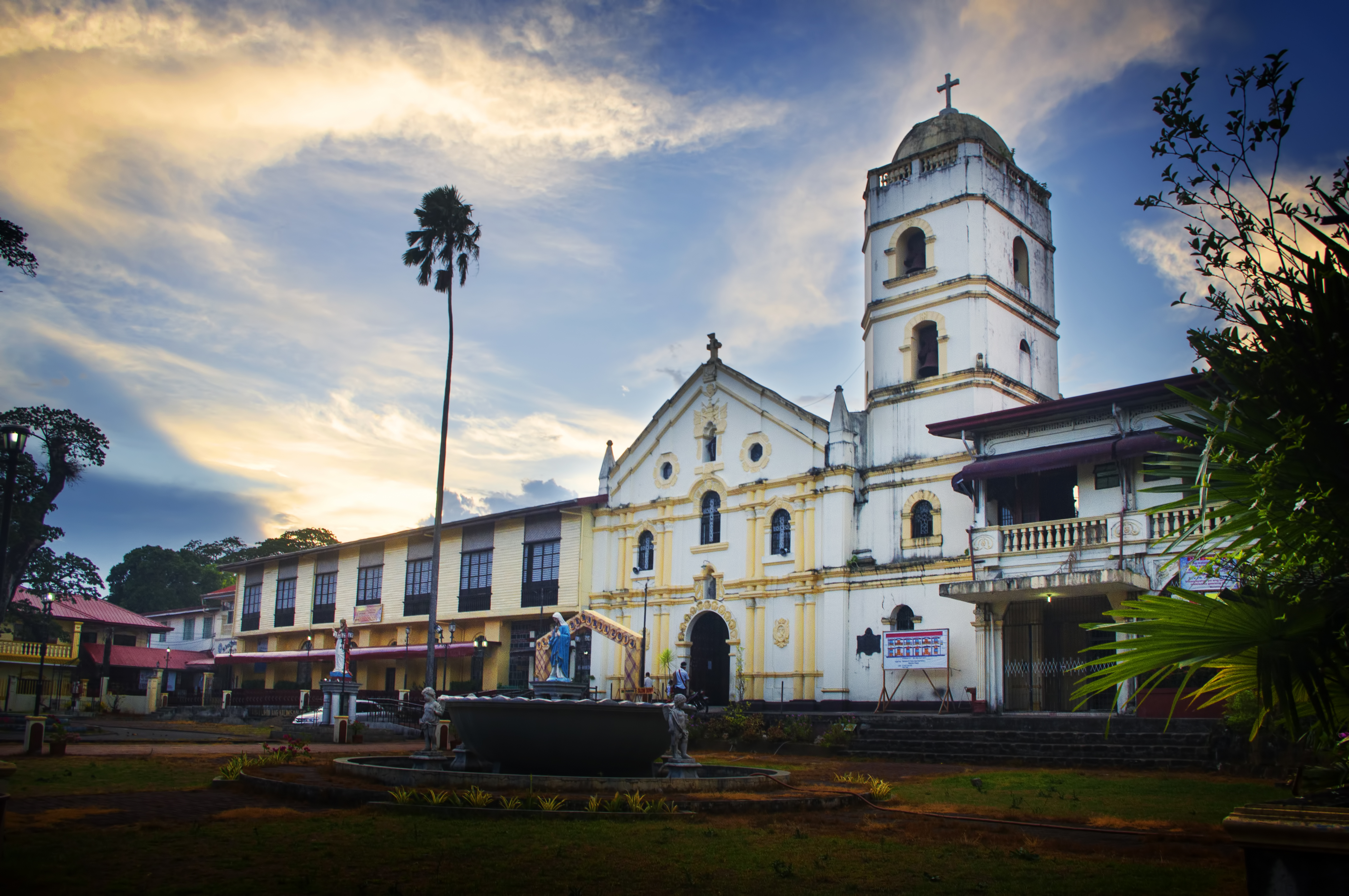
Sariaya Church built in 1748

Saint Francis of Assisi Parish Church is a stone church built in 1748, located at Barangay Poblacion II. Records tell that the present church is the fifth one erected by the Spanish Franciscan Friars in the history of Sariaya. In 1938, a historical marker bearing a brief history of the church was installed on its facade by the National Research and Markers Committee, precursor of the National Historical Commission of the Philippines.

=== Heritage houses ===
On May 14, 2008, the National Historical Institute (NHI) unveiled markers of heritage houses for the three ancient yet still stately mansions at the heart of Sariaya town. These venerable houses are best viewed from the south, as they are silhouetted against the majestic and mystical Mount Banahaw, Quezon's long-dormant volcano. Cultural recognition was bestowed on three ancestral houses, namely: The Enriquez-Gala mansion, owned by former Tayabas (now Quezon) Gov. Natalio Enriquez and Susana Gala; the Gala-Rodriguez house of Dr. Isidro Rodriguez and Gregoria Gala, and the house of Catalino and Luisa Rodriguez also known as Villa Sariaya.

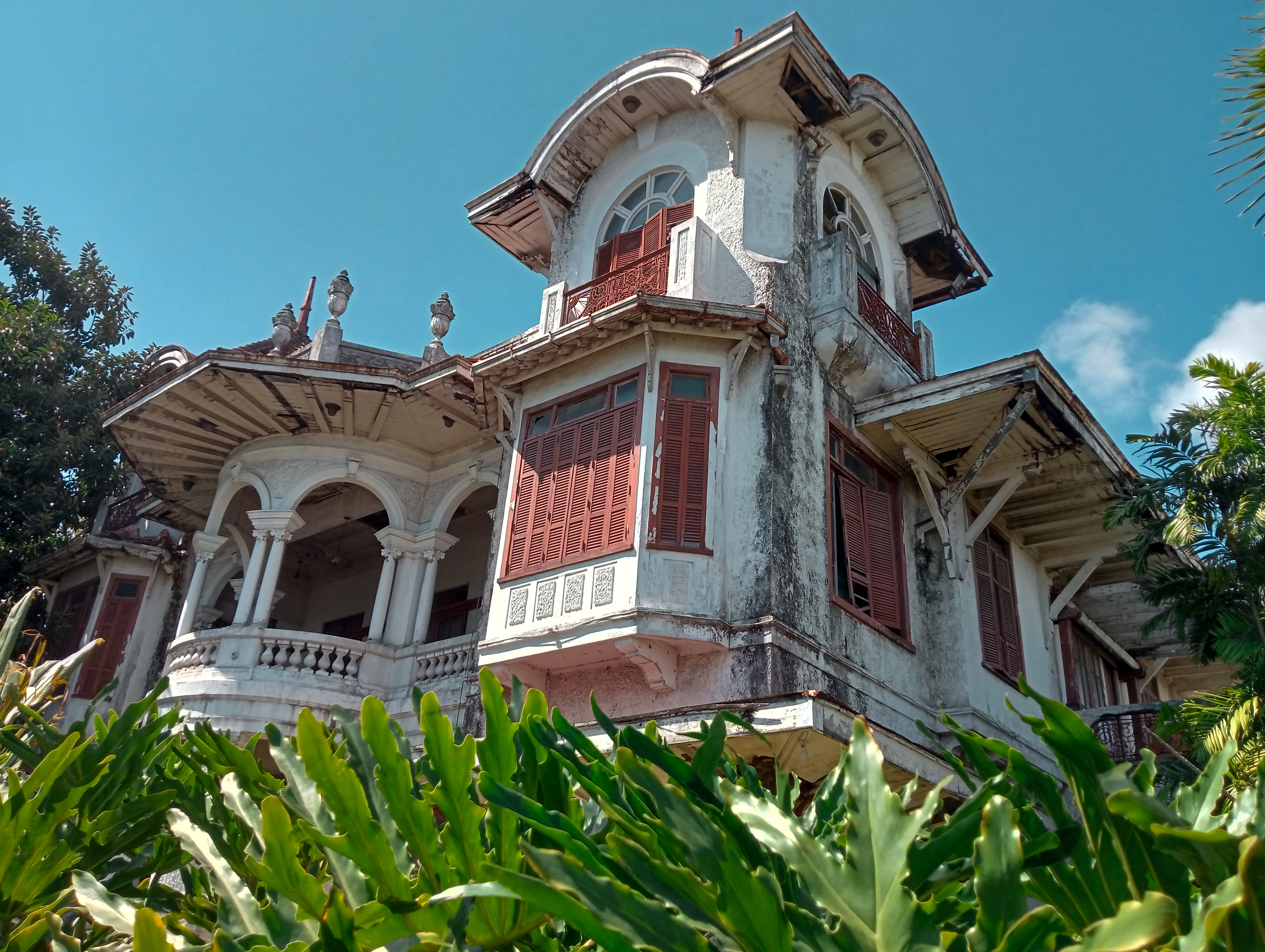
Governor Natalio Enriquez Ancestral House

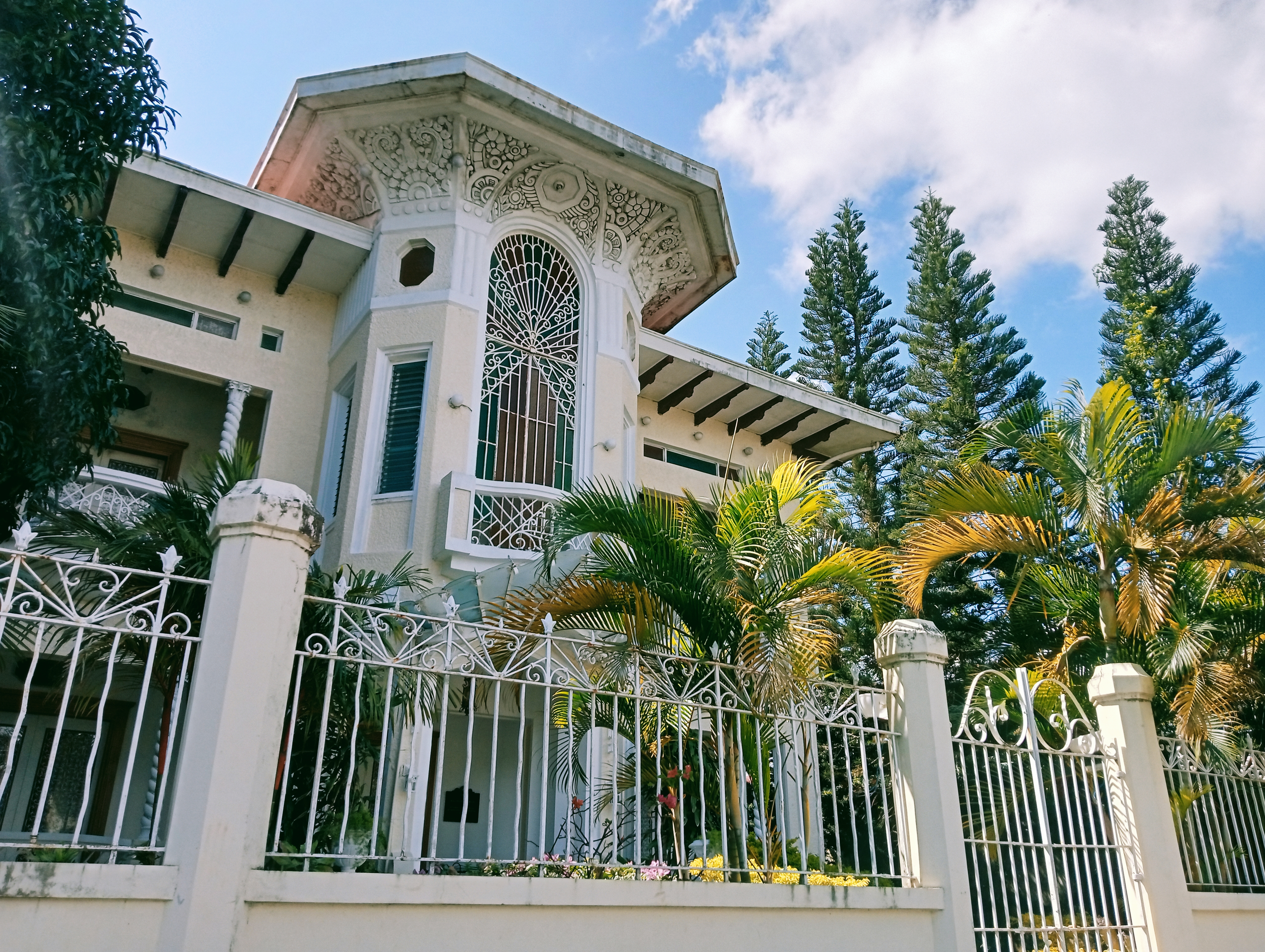
Gala-Rodriguez Ancestral House

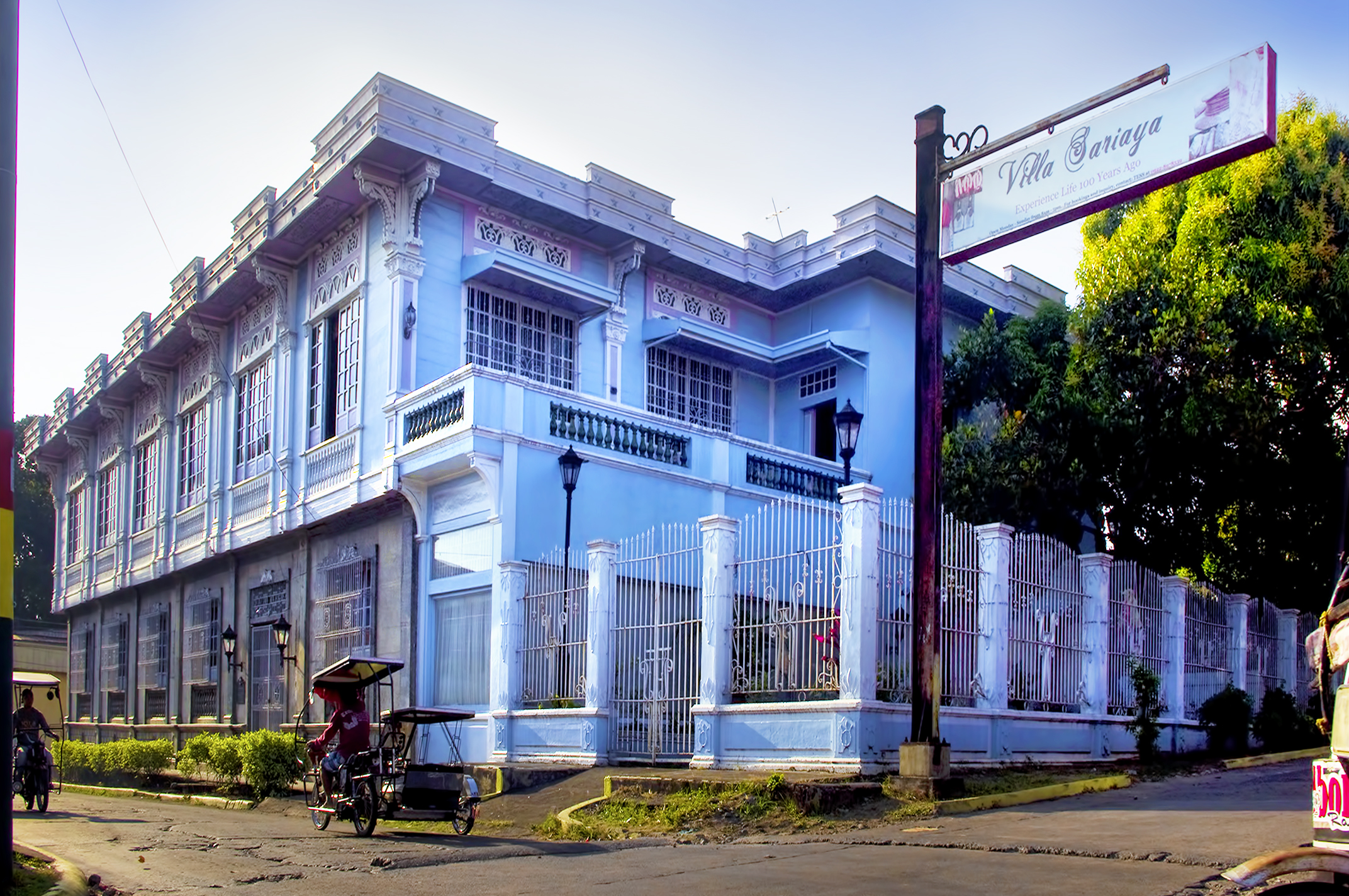
Don Catalino Rodriguez Ancestral House (Villa Sariaya)

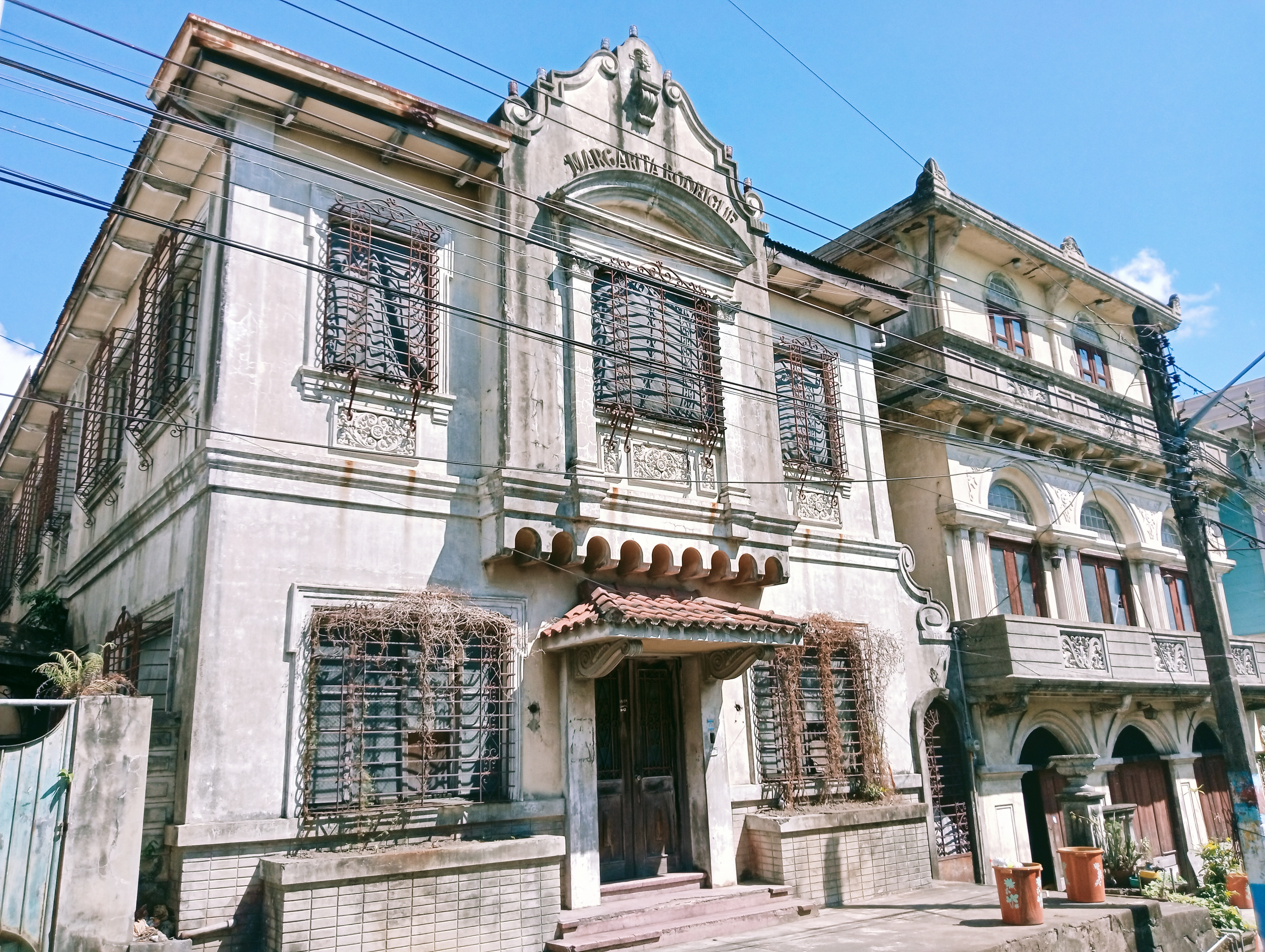
Margarita Rodriguez Ancestral House

=== Tumbaga Church ruins ===
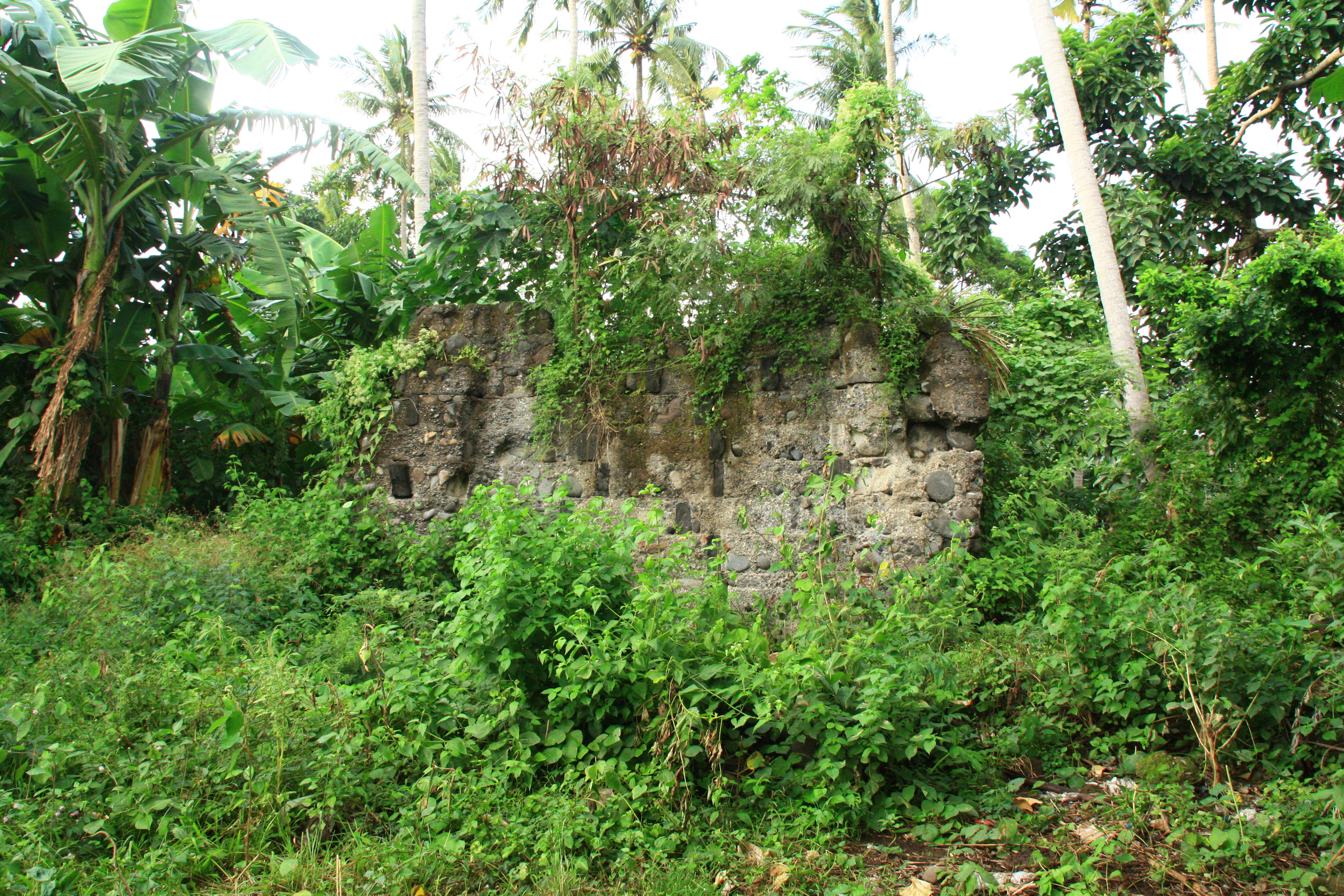
Extant wall of Tumbaga Church ruins

Remains of an early 18th-century stone church and former town site of Sariaya, located at Barangay Tumbaga I. The settlement was inaugurated in 1703 with Father Lucas Fernandez as first parish priest and Francisco Argente as Presidente del Pueblo. The church, which measured 500 square meters (5,400 sq ft), served a recorded population of 3000 parishioners. Two events led to the abandonment of the town site: the earthquake of 1743 which consequently destroyed the church's bell tower, and the Moro raids which left the town site in ruins after being razed by fire. The venerated image of Santo Cristo de Burgos is said to have been enshrined in the church before it was transferred to its present shrine in the San Francisco Church in the present-day town proper of Sariaya. The unscathed image was said have been retrieved from the burnt church after the Muslim raider attack. The church is believed to be the fourth church structure built by the Spanish Franciscan Friars in Sariaya.

=== Sariaya Park ===
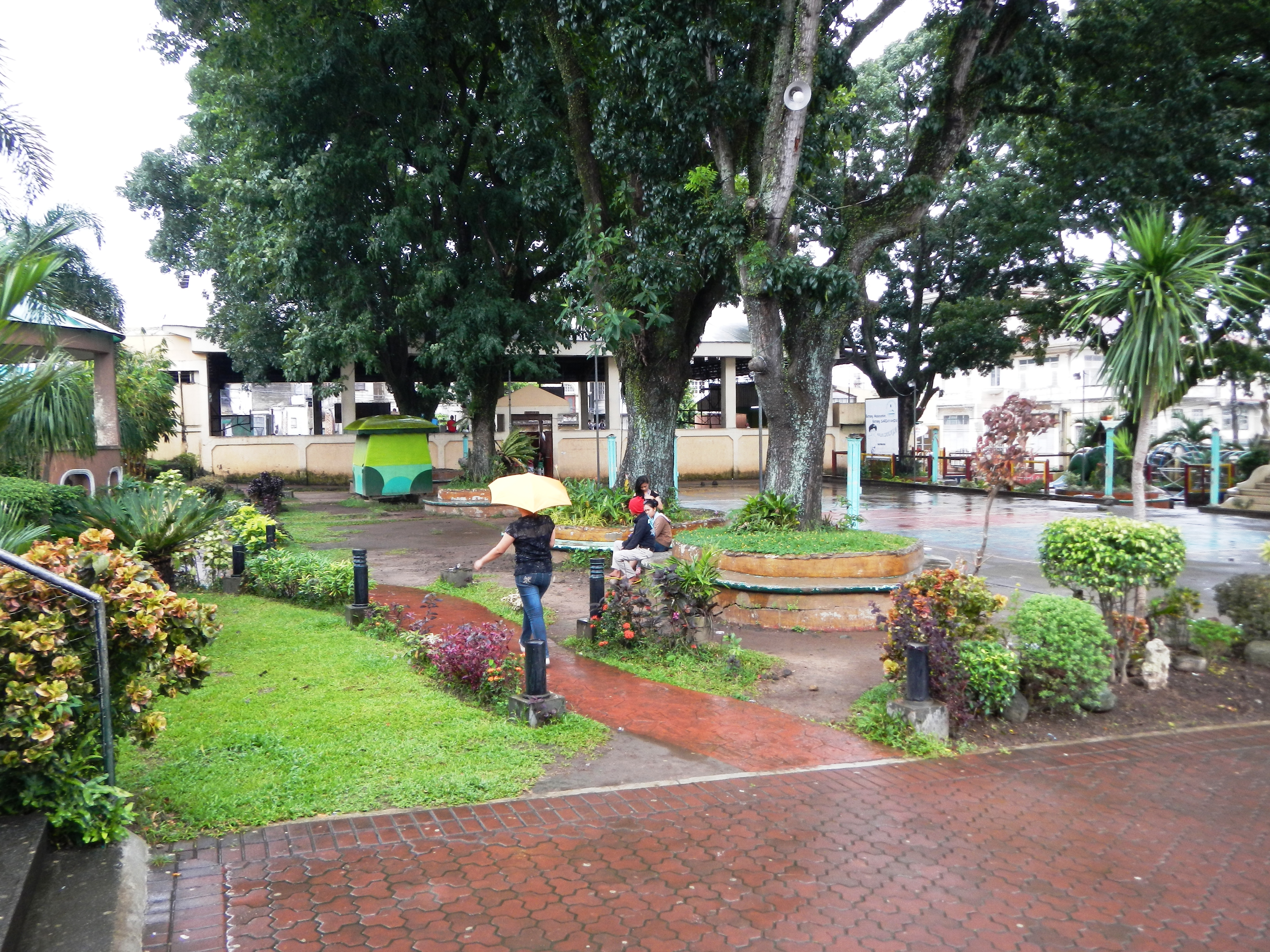
Sariaya Park

This multi-purpose park is a perfect place for recreational activities because of its pleasant and calm ambiance where kids can play at the park's playground, located at the heart of the town in front of Sariaya Church and the Town Hall at the left side. Sariaya Park is also the location where Sariaya Sports Complex is situated and usually used as the venue of different events and Basketball Leagues in the town.

== Healthcare ==
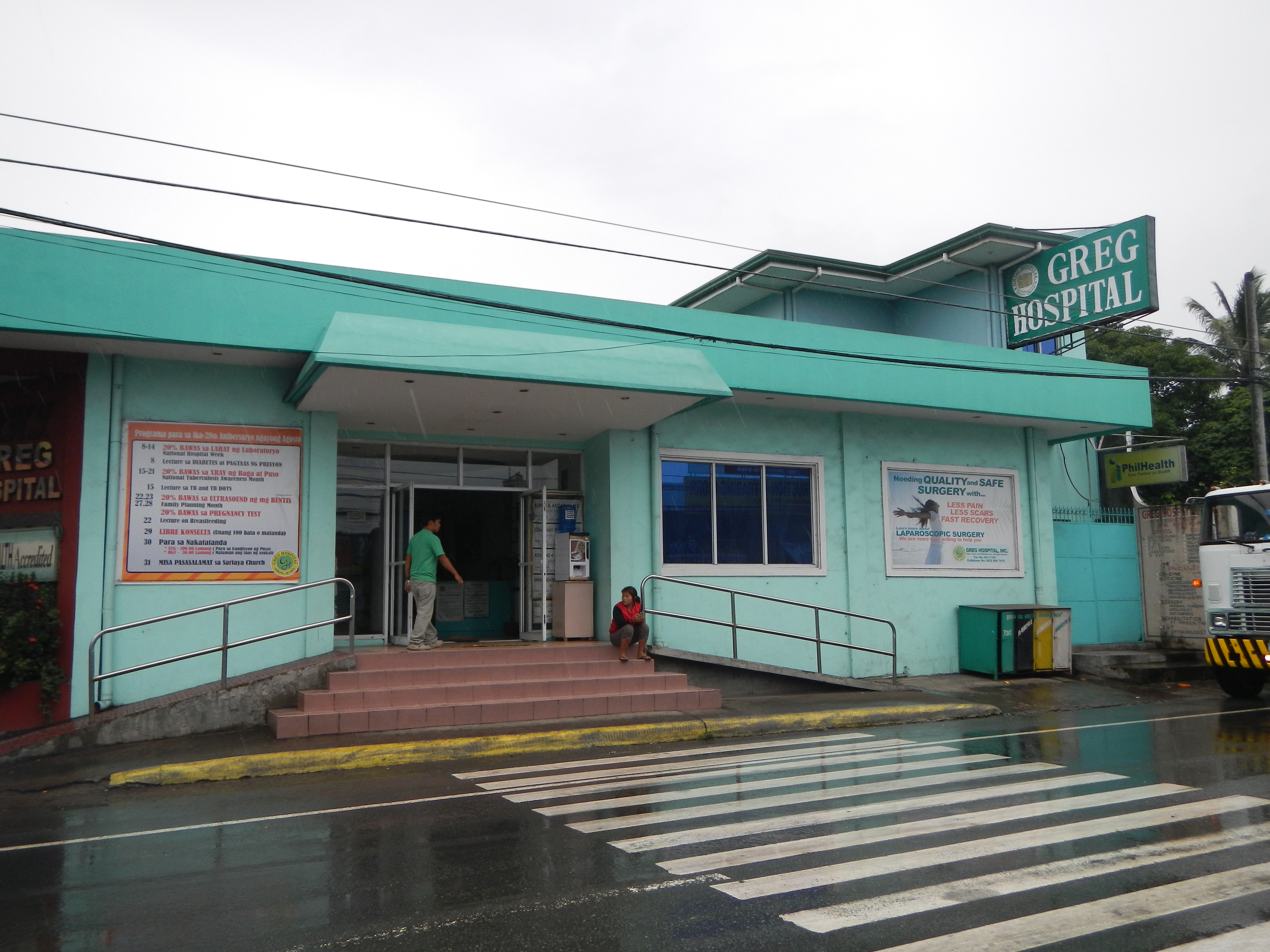
Greg Hospital, one of the three hospitals located in Sariaya

There are three private hospitals in Sariaya, with a dependable and well-staffed health center providing free medical and preventive services for residents of the forty-three barangays of the municipality.

- Greg Hospital, located at General Luna St., Barangay Poblacion 1
- Soler General Hospital, located at Mabini St., Barangay Poblacion 6
- Allied Care Experts (ACE) Medical Center, located at Maharlika Hwy., Barangay Gibanga

== Education ==
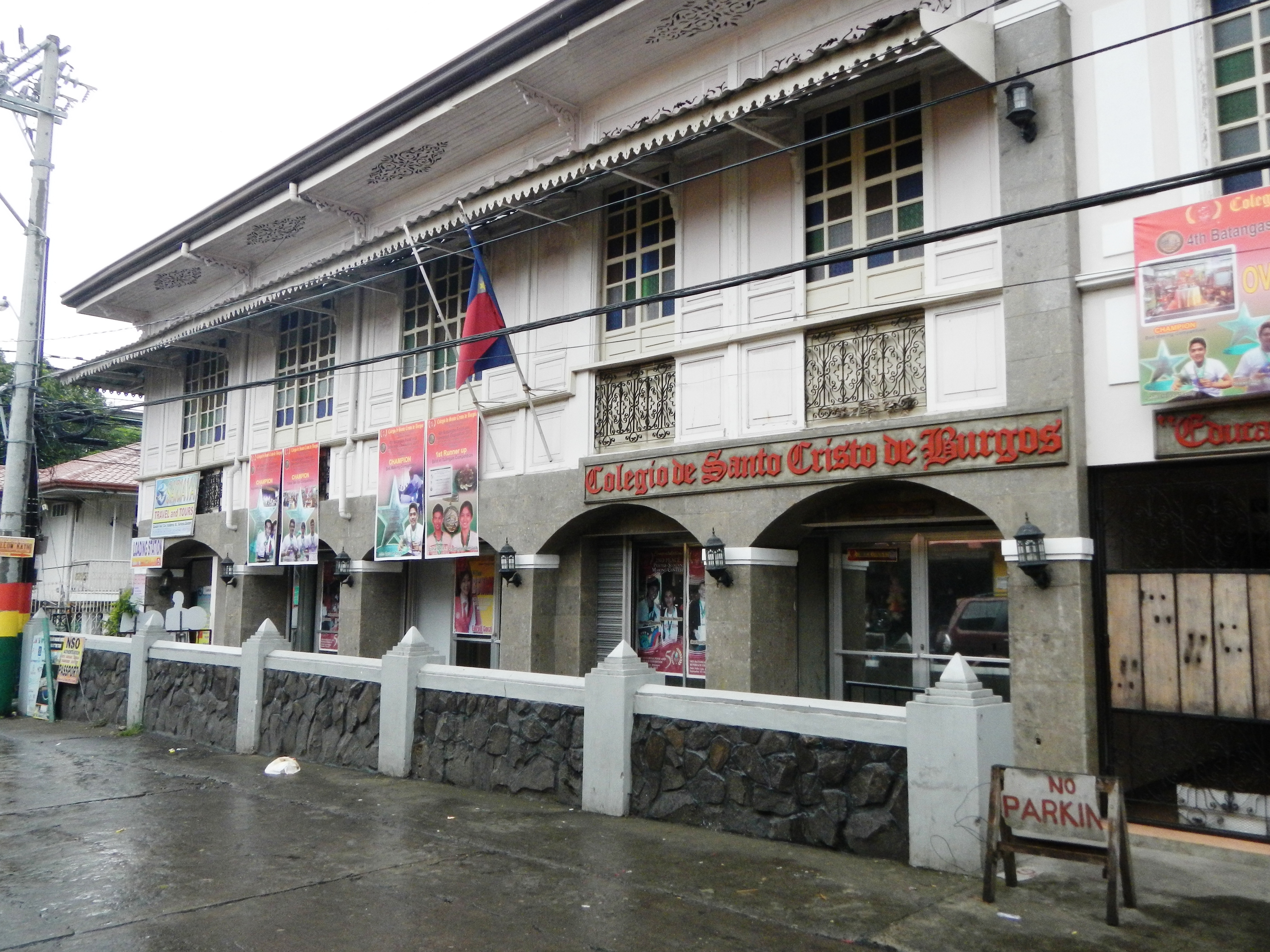
Colegio de Santo Cristo de Burgos

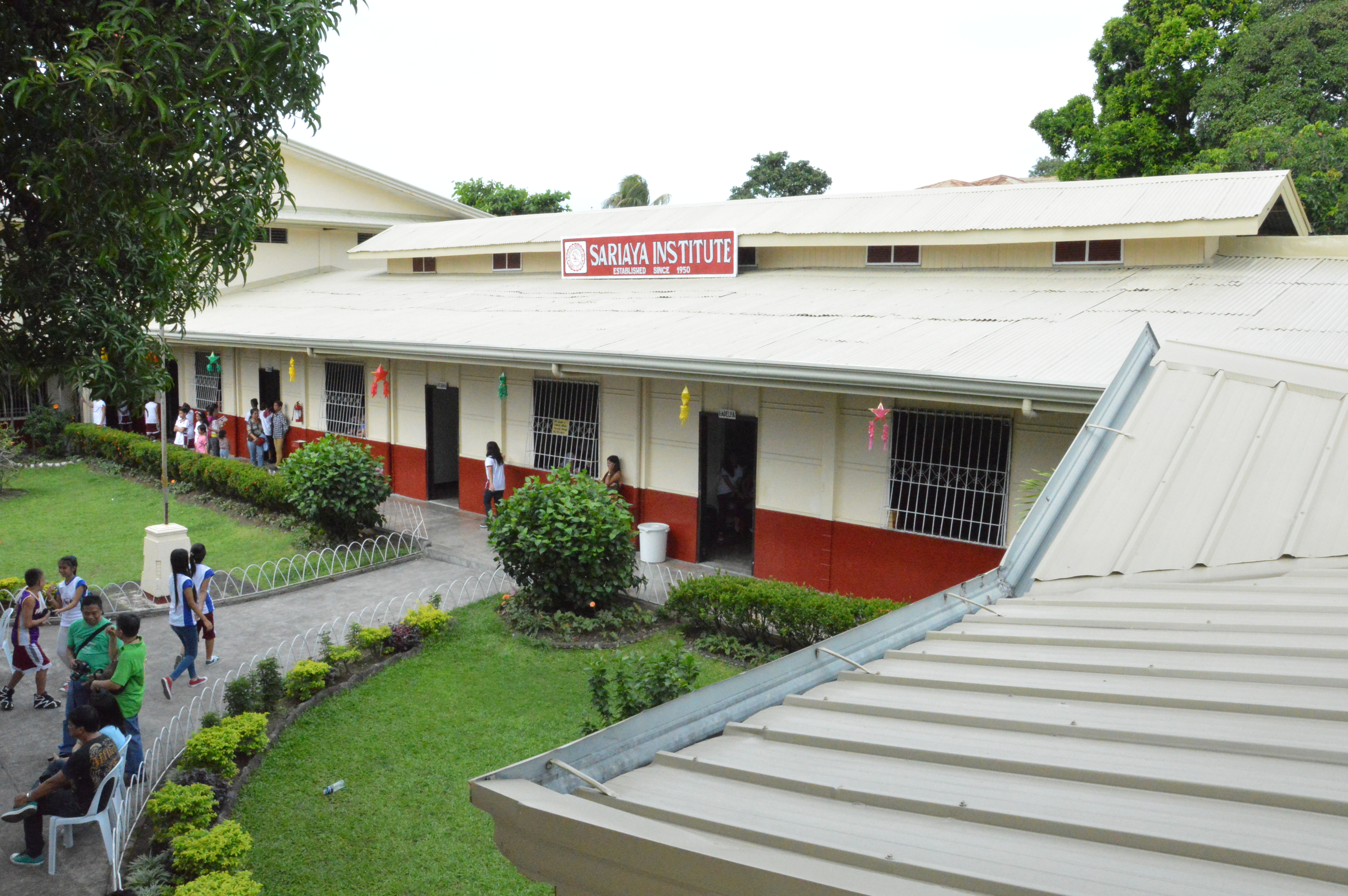
Sariaya Institute

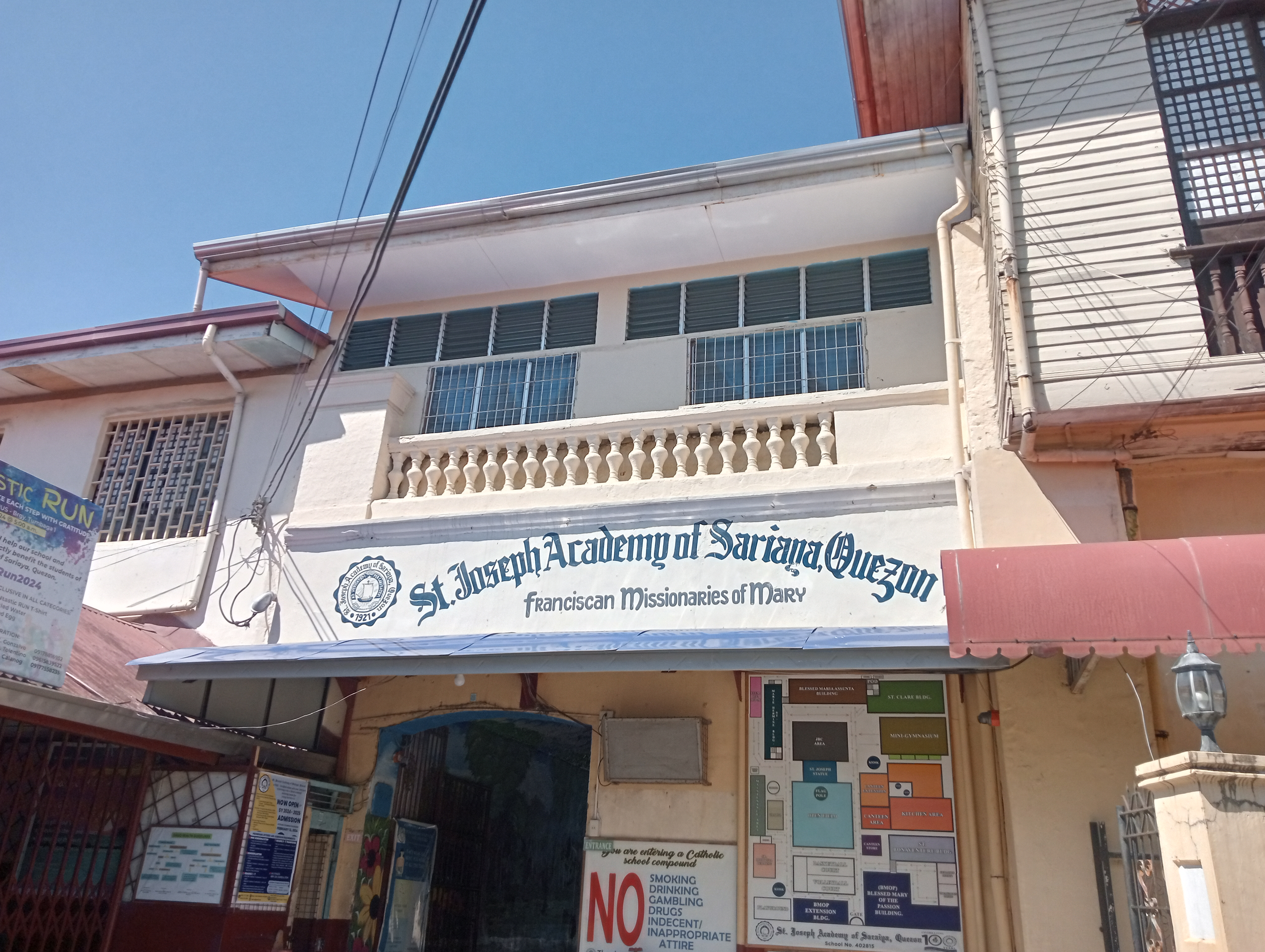
St. Joseph's Academy

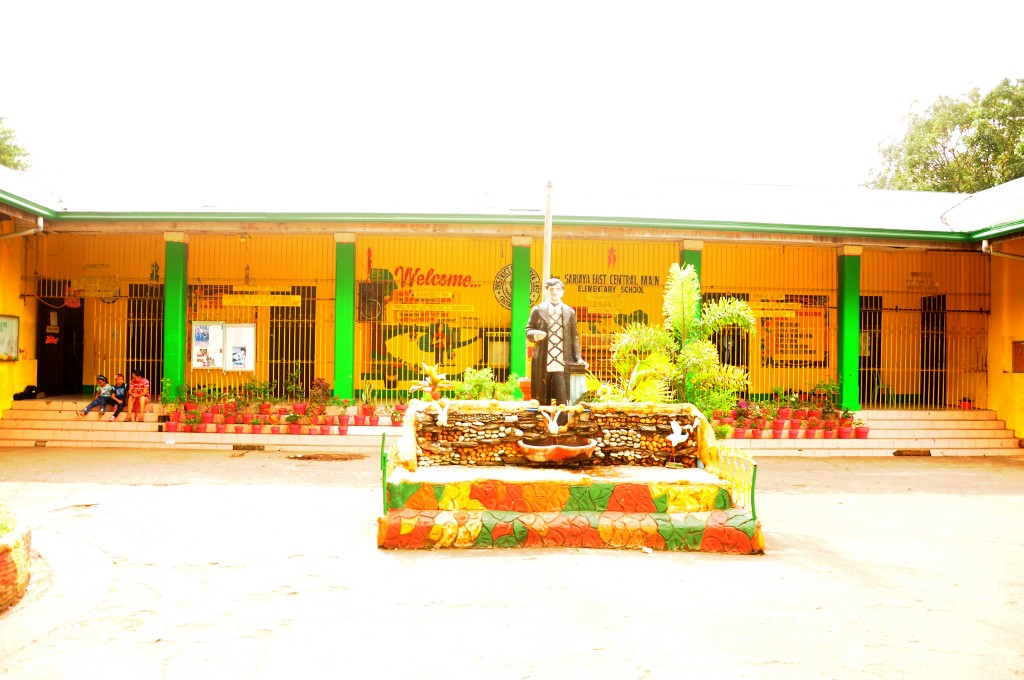
Sariaya East Central Main Elementary School

There are two schools district offices which govern all educational institutions within the municipality. They oversee the management and operations of all private and public, from primary to secondary schools. These are the Sariaya East Schools District, and Sariaya West Schools District.

Educational Institutions in Sariaya
| Level | School |
|---|---|
| Higher educational institutions | CSTC - College of Sciences, Technology, and Communications, Inc. |
| Higher educational institutions | Colegio de Santo Cristo de Burgos |
| Secondary schools | Sariaya Institute (private non-sectarian) |
| Secondary schools | St. Joseph's Academy of Sariaya, Quezon (private sectarian) |
| Secondary schools | St. Francis High School (private sectarian) |
| Secondary schools | Mamala Integrated School (public) |
| Secondary schools | Lutucan Integrated National High School (public) |
| Secondary schools | Governor Anacleto C. Alcala National High School (public) |
| Secondary schools | Canda National High School (public) |
| Secondary schools | Sariaya National High School (public) |
| Secondary schools | Pili National High School (public) |
| Secondary schools | Janagdong National High School (public) |
| Primary and elementary schools | Sariaya East Central Main Elementary School |
| Primary and elementary schools | Manuel L. Quezon Elementary School |
| Primary and elementary schools | Jose Rizal Elementary School |
| Primary and elementary schools | Antipolo Elementary School |
| Primary and elementary schools | Balubal Gibanga Elementary School |
| Primary and elementary schools | Bogon Elementary School |
| Primary and elementary schools | Sampaloc Elementary School |
| Primary and elementary schools | Sto. Cristo Elementary School |
| Primary and elementary schools | Concepcion Elementary School |
| Primary and elementary schools | Governor Natalio and Susana Enriquez Elementary School |
| Primary and elementary schools | Pili Elementary School |
| Primary and elementary schools | Pantoc Elementary School |
| Primary and elementary schools | Talaan Elementary School |
| Primary and elementary schools | Tumbaga 1 Elementary School |
| Primary and elementary schools | Tumbaga 2 Elementary School |
| Primary and elementary schools | Morong Elementary School |
| Primary and elementary schools | Montecillo Elementary School |
| Primary and elementary schools | Kiling Elementary School |
| Primary and elementary schools | Manggalang Elementary School |
| Primary and elementary schools | Concepcion Ibaba Elementary School |
| Primary and elementary schools | Concepcion Pinagbakuran Elementary School |
| Primary and elementary schools | Lutucan 1 Elementary School |
| Primary and elementary schools | Lutucan Bata Elementary School |
| Primary and elementary schools | Lutucan Central School |
| Primary and elementary schools | Concepcion Banahaw Elementary School |
| Primary and elementary schools | Tulo-Tulo Elementary School |
| Primary and elementary schools | Castañas Elementary School |
| Primary and elementary schools | Lutucan Adventist Elementary School |
| Primary and elementary schools | Sariaya Conservative Baptist Christian School Inc. |
| Primary and elementary schools | Holy Spirit Learning Center |
| Primary and elementary schools | St. Therese of the Child Jesus Learning Center |
| Primary and elementary schools | Beersheba Christian School |

== Notable personalities ==
- Leo Austria — former professional basketball player and the head coach of San Miguel Beermen of the Philippine Basketball Association
- Lily Monteverde — movie producer
- Emiliano A. Gala — member of the Philippine Assembly from 1907 to 1909

== Sister cities ==
Sariaya has a sister city relationship with the foreign community of:

- Santa Clarita, California, United States, since 2003
