= Inauguration of Bongbong Marcos =

2022 Philippine presidential inauguration

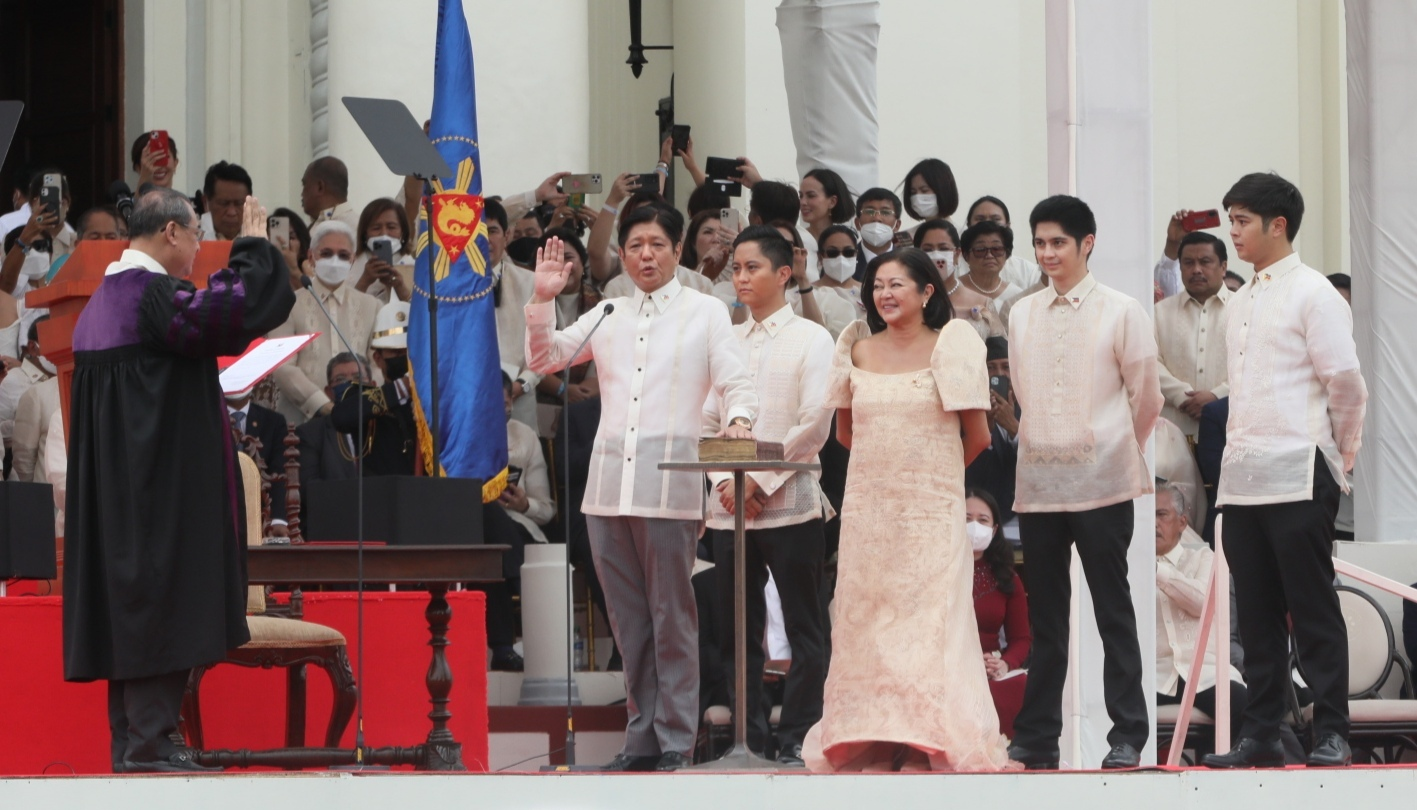
- Bongbong Marcos takes his oath of office as the 17th president of the Philippines.
- Date: June 30, 2022; 3 years ago
- Location: Marcos: National Museum of Fine Arts Manila Duterte: San Pedro Square Davao City
- Participants: President of the Philippines, Bongbong Marcos Assuming office Chief Justice of the Supreme Court of the Philippines, Alexander Gesmundo Administering oath Vice President of the Philippines, Sara Duterte Assuming office Associate Justice of the Supreme Court of the Philippines, Ramon Paul Hernando Administering oath

The inauguration of Bongbong Marcos as the president of the Philippines took place around noon (PHT) on Thursday, June 30, 2022, at the National Museum of Fine Arts. The chief justice of the Supreme Court Alexander Gesmundo administered the oath of office, a first in 18 years, since the previous two presidential oaths were administered by an associate justice.

It was the fourth Philippine presidential inauguration held at the National Museum of Fine Arts, as the venue was previously used for the inauguration of former presidents Manuel L. Quezon in 1935, José P. Laurel in 1943, and Manuel Roxas in 1946 when it was then known as the Legislative Building.

Sara Duterte, who was elected as the vice president of the Philippines, held a separate inauguration on Sunday, June 19, 2022, at the San Pedro Square in Davao City, but assumed the post on June 30. According to Duterte, her inauguration was scheduled earlier so that she could attend Marcos's.

== Background ==
The inauguration marked the end of the presidential transition of Bongbong Marcos, who was elected in the 2022 Philippine presidential election on May 9, 2022. Marcos topped the official count by the Congress of the Philippines with 31,629,783 votes or 58.77% of all votes, a landslide victory. The joint bicameral Congress proclaimed Marcos as the president-elect and Sara Duterte as the vice president-elect on May 25, 2022.

Upon his inauguration, Marcos became the first majority president since the establishment of the Fifth Republic in 1986. He also became the second president from Ilocos Norte (after his father and namesake Ferdinand Marcos), and the third child of a former president to hold the post (after Gloria Macapagal Arroyo and Benigno Aquino III). Meanwhile, Duterte became the first majority vice president since the establishment of the Fifth Republic in 1986, the first vice president from Davao City, the youngest to be elected as vice president having aged only 44, the third woman to hold the post (after Gloria Macapagal Arroyo and Leni Robredo), the third vice president who is a child of a president (after Salvador Laurel and Gloria Macapagal Arroyo), the third vice president to come from Mindanao (after Emmanuel Pelaez and Teofisto Guingona Jr.), and the fourth Cebuano-speaking vice president overall (after Sergio Osmeña, Carlos P. Garcia, and Emmanuel Pelaez). Together, they are the first presidential ticket to win together since the 2004 election which was won by Arroyo and Noli de Castro.

== Marcos's inaugural ceremony ==
=== Planning and preparations ===
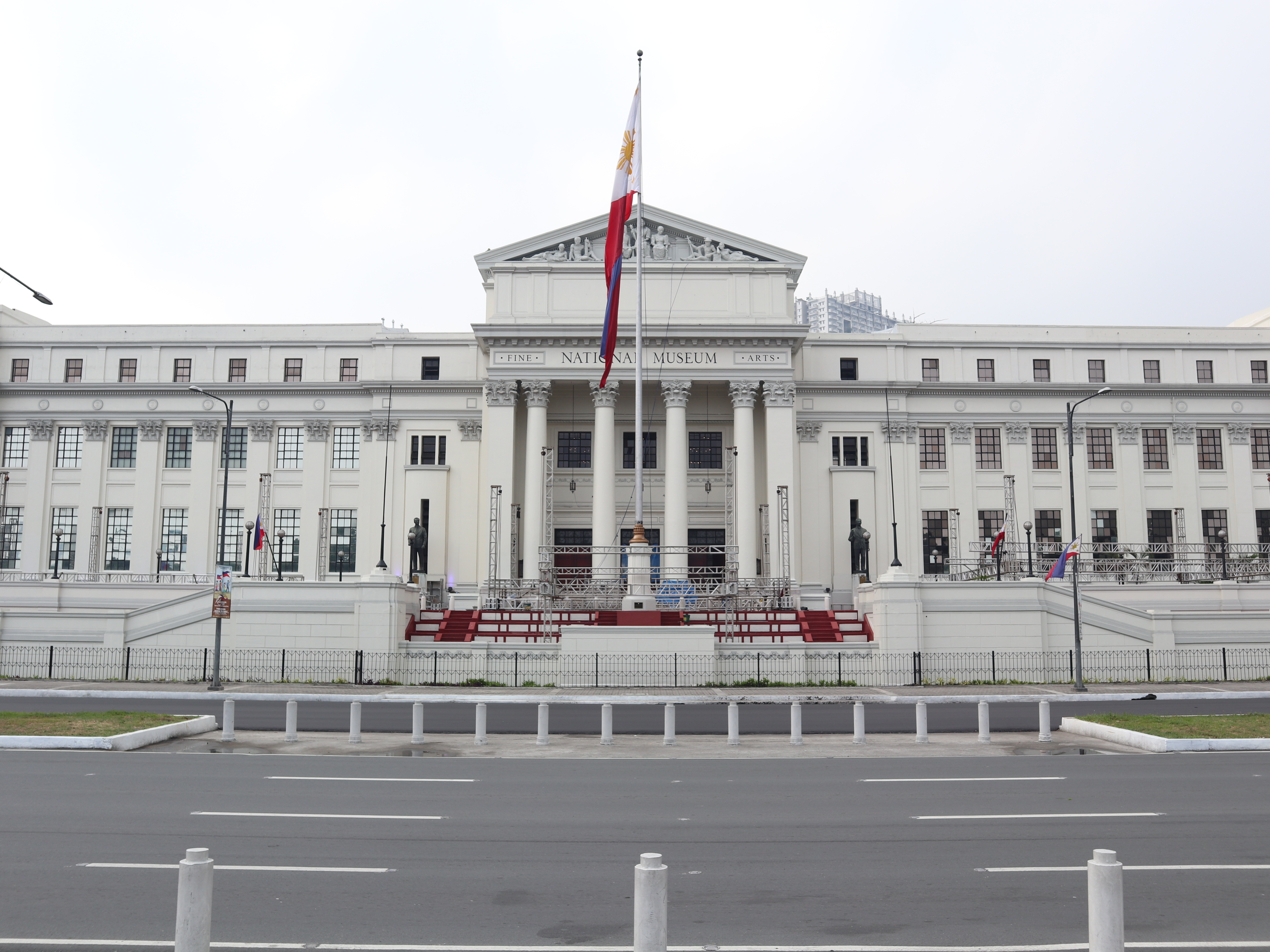
The National Museum of Fine Arts served as the venue for Marcos's inauguration.

Marcos's sister Irene Marcos was put in charge of the preparations for the inauguration.

The National Museum of Fine Arts was selected as the venue of the inauguration. The museum is closed from June 6 to July 4 for the preparations and for the inauguration itself. The Quirino Grandstand at the Rizal Park where the inauguration of several presidents (including Marcos's father, Ferdinand Marcos) had been held, was earlier considered as a possible venue along with the museum. However, the grandstand was soon rejected as the adjacent area was currently occupied by the Manila COVID-19 Field Hospital. Fort Santiago was another venue considered for its inauguration. A portion of the Club Intramuros Golf Course adjacent to the museum was used to accommodate an audience of 2000 to 3000 people.

On inauguration day, Marcos wore two sets of barong designed by Pepito Albert: a modern barong inspired from the Spanish colonial era rayadillo for activities in the morning and a fully-embroidered barong from Taal for events in the evening.

=== Security and travel restrictions ===
The Manila local government declared the inauguration day as a special non-working holiday in the city. Government offices in the city suspended work from June 29 to 30 in connection with the inauguration. Select roads near the venue were closed and traffic was rerouted. A gun-ban was imposed in the whole of Metro Manila from June 27 to July 2, 2022. The Philippine National Police (PNP) deployed 6,000 personnel while the Metropolitan Manila Development Authority dispatched 2,000 traffic personnel near the vicinity.

=== Ceremony ===
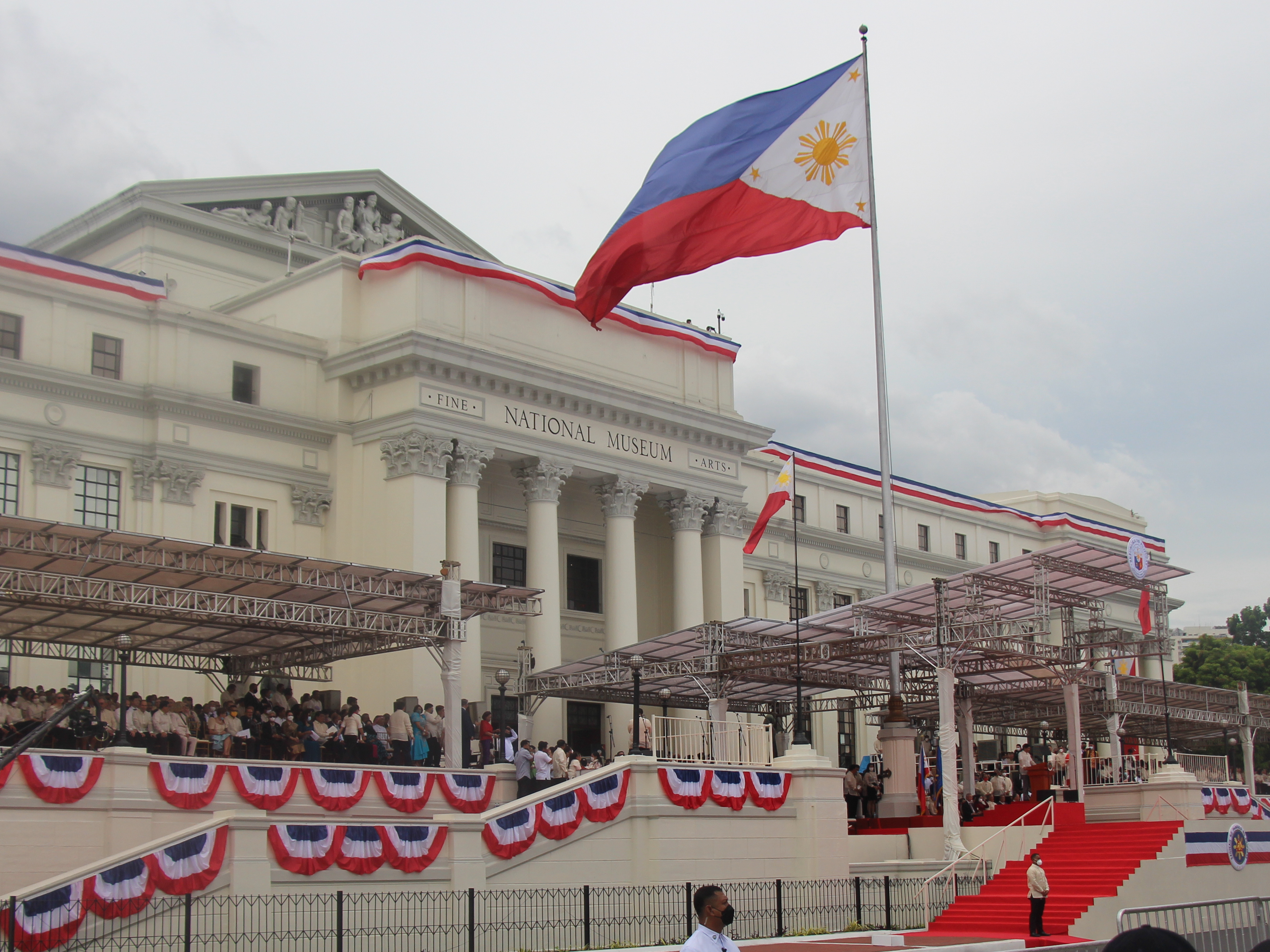
The National Museum during the inauguration ceremony.

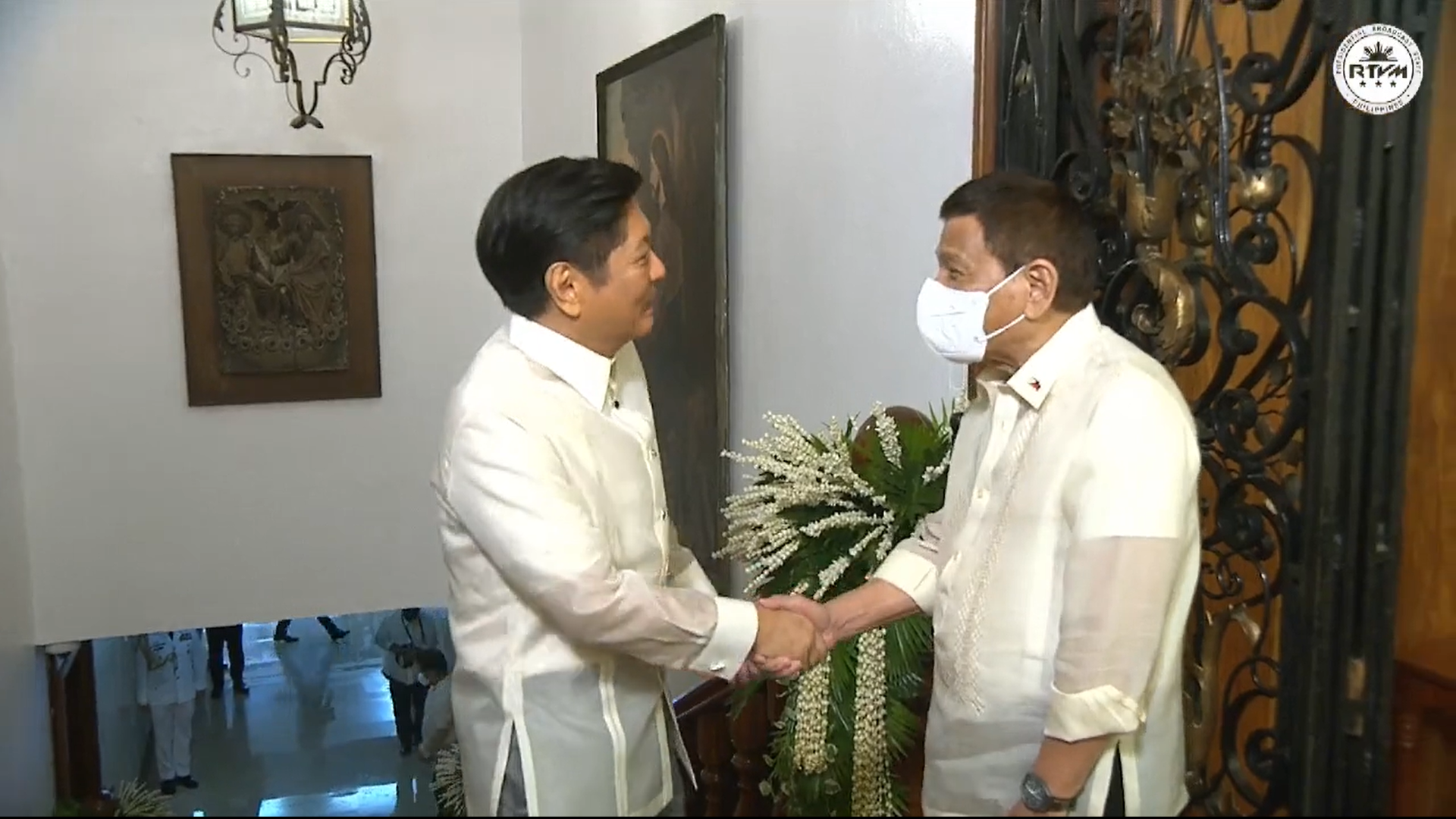
Marcos (left) meets outgoing President Rodrigo Duterte (right) at Malacañang

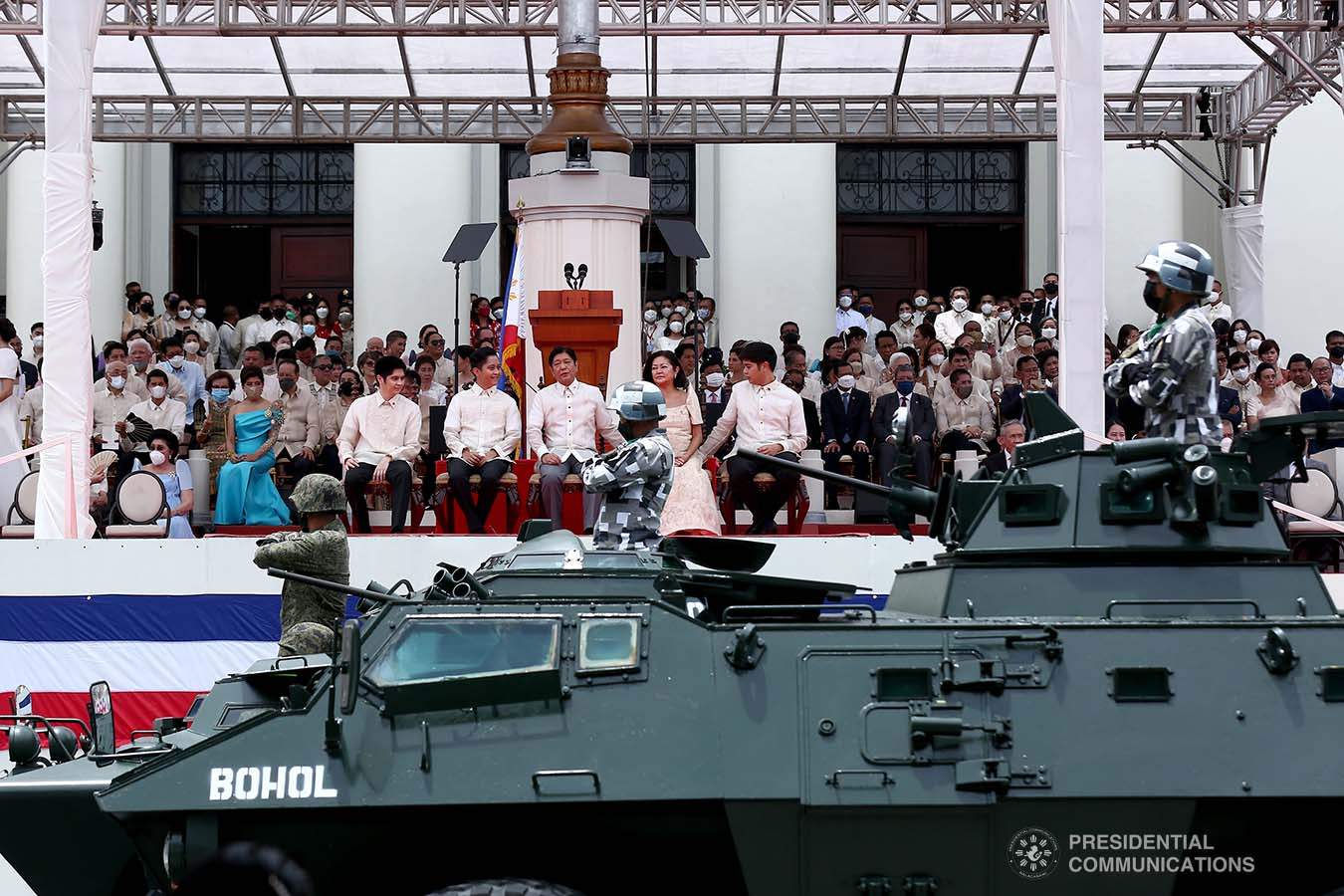
Marcos and his family members watch a military-civilian parade joined by security personnel from the AFP, PCG, and PNP during his presidential inauguration.

Before the inauguration rites, departure honors in Malacañang Palace grounds for the outgoing President Rodrigo Duterte was held. Duterte arrived at around 9:00 a.m. and was followed shortly by Marcos. The two proceeded inside Malacañang and held one-on-one talks, descended the Palace stairs, and witnessed the departure honors for Duterte, which began with a 21-gun salute followed by an inspection of troops, and the farewell of the outgoing president to his cabinet members. Duterte proceeded to leave first for a visit to the Greenbelt shopping mall in Makati before embarking a commercial flight back to Davao City at 5:00 p.m. PST (UTC+08), while President-elect Marcos stayed a couple of minutes before departing for the National Museum of Fine Arts.

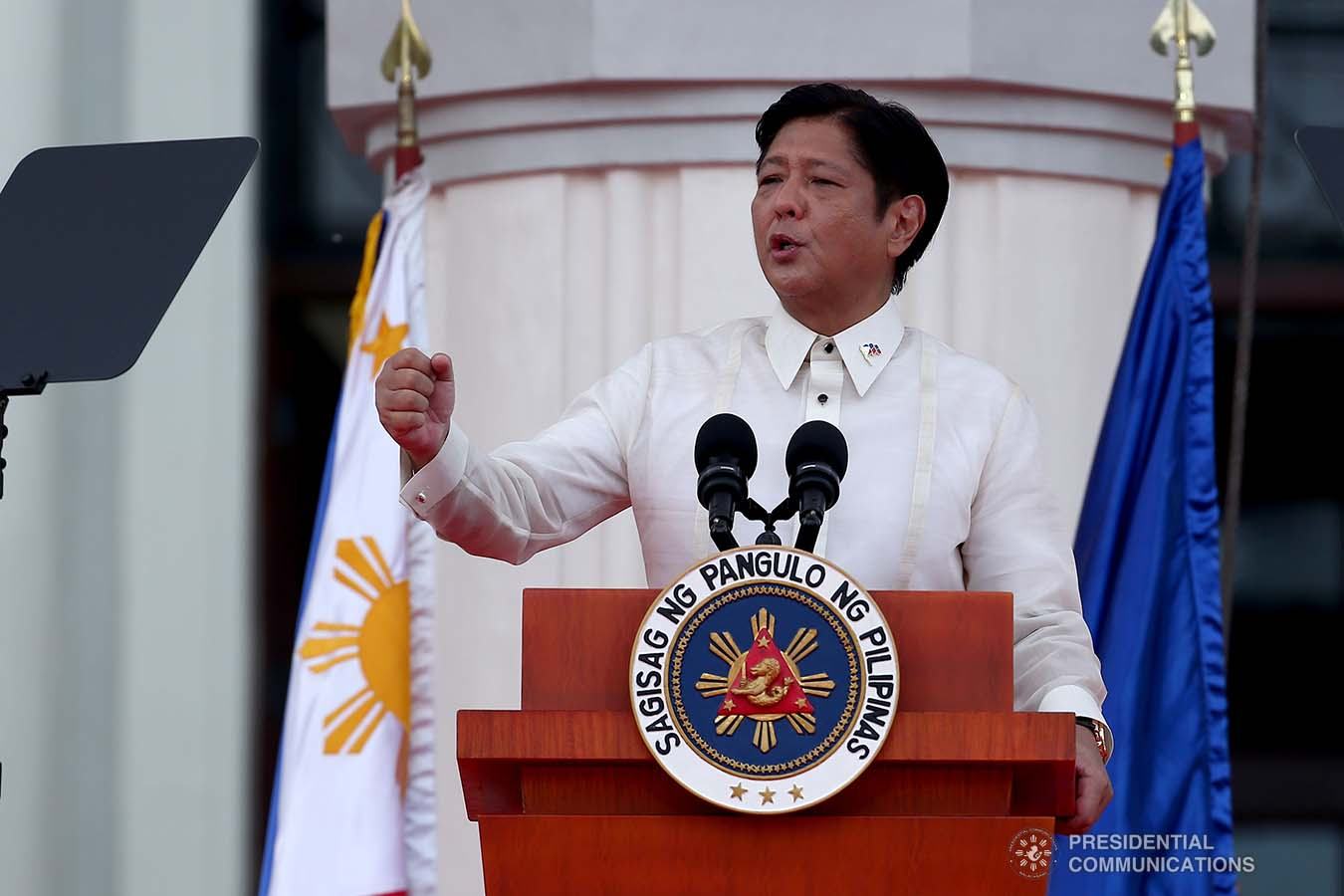
Marcos delivering his inaugural address.

After Marcos arrived at the venue, the ceremony began with the singing of the national anthem, Lupang Hinirang, by Toni Gonzaga. Following the singing of the national anthem, an interfaith prayer and a full military and civil parade was held. Senate President Tito Sotto then read the proclamation of the election results. Marcos then began taking his oath of office. He used a Bible that was also used during the first presidential inauguration of his father Ferdinand in 1965. As per tradition, the chief justice of the Supreme Court, Alexander Gesmundo, administered the oath of office. At exactly 12:00 PST (UTC+08), Marcos recited the following, as prescribed by the Constitution:

Ako, si Ferdinand Romualdez Marcos Jr., ay taimtim na nanunumpa na tutuparin ko nang buong katapatan at sigasig ang aking mga tungkulin bilang Pangulo ng Pilipinas, pangangalagaan at ipagtatanggol ang kanyang Konstitusyon, ipatutupad ang mga batas nito, magiging makatarungan sa bawat tao, at itatalaga ang aking sarili sa paglilingkod sa Bansa. Kasihan nawa ako ng Diyos.

Upon completing the oath of office, a 21-gun salute was immediately fired, followed by four ruffles and flourishes and the presidential anthem "We Say Mabuhay" and the presidential honors music Marangal na Parangal (Glorious Honors) in honor of the new president. He then afterwards delivered his inaugural address.

In his inaugural address that lasted for about 25 minutes, Marcos enumerated his priorities as the president, such as the economy, environment, infrastructure development, and the ongoing COVID-19 pandemic, giving a preview of what his presidency will look like. He reiterated his promise of unifying leadership, stating that by voting for him, the people rejected the "politics of division." Marcos also asked for the public's help in achieving his vision for the country although he will not base his success on the people's cooperation. He also thanked his predecessor for "the courage of his hard decisions."

Marcos stated that his economic team was forming a "comprehensive, all-inclusive plan" for the economy and also vowed to address food security in his tenure. He also committed to finish the ongoing infrastructure projects of the past administration on time, and pledged to create a more comprehensive infrastructure plan that will be implemented within his administration. Regarding the country’s COVID-19 response, Marcos stated that there were shortcomings that he wanted to fix, recalling his experience after being infected with the disease. He also vowed to take steps to address climate change and criticized richer countries who are not as affected by its impacts and are doing little about it. The new president also vowed to reform the educational curriculum under his administration, but clarified that he pertained to the sciences and vocational skills, not history. Marcos concluded his speech by thanking the people, vowing to do his best.

Marcos stated that he won the largest electoral mandate in Philippine history. Although he won the most number of votes for the presidency, three former presidents, Manuel L. Quezon, Ramon Magsaysay, and his father garnered a higher percentage of the vote than him. Marcos also claimed that his father was the only president to have delivered food security to the Philippines, although his administration was marked by increased inflation, famine, and heavy importation of food; some programs, such as Masagana 99, were only initially successful and were unsustainable in the end. Marcos also claimed that sustainable fossil-free technologies have yet to be invented to support whole economies and is not yet seriously tried by developed countries; however, several countries have already committed to renewable energy technology to move away from fossil fuels and slow down climate change in the context of the ongoing Russian invasion of Ukraine affecting global oil markets. Marcos also claimed that he was the one who built the Bangui Wind Farm in the province of Ilocos Norte when he was the provincial governor. Although the windmills were built during his tenure as governor in 2005, the project was primarily a private venture of the NorthWind Power Development Corporation (NPDC).

=== International leaders and representatives ===
Country	Leader	Status	Ref
Australia	David Hurley	Governor-General of Australia	
Brunei	Erywan Yusof	Second Foreign Minister of Brunei	
Cambodia	Say Sam Al	Environment Minister of Cambodia	
China	Wang Qishan	Vice President of the People's Republic of China	
Holy See	Charles John Brown	Apostolic Nuncio to the Philippines and Dean of the Diplomatic Corps	
India	Rajkumar Ranjan Singh	Minister of State and Education of India	
Indonesia	Mahfud MD	Coordinating Minister for Political, Legal and Security Affairs of Indonesia	
Japan	Yoshimasa Hayashi	Minister of Foreign Affairs of Japan	
South Korea	Kweon Seong-dong	Member of the National Assembly of South Korea representative of President Yoon Suk Yeol and the South Korean Government	
Laos	Phoxay Khaykhamphithoune	Deputy Minister of Foreign Affairs of Laos	
Malaysia	Saifuddin Abdullah	Minister of Foreign Affairs of Malaysia	
Saudi Arabia	Faisal bin Farhan Al Saud	Minister of Foreign Affairs of Saudi Arabia	
Singapore	Maliki Osman	Minister in the Prime Minister's Office, Second Education Minister and Second Foreign Minister of Singapore	
Thailand	Don Pramudwinai	Deputy Prime Minister and Foreign Minister of Thailand	
United Kingdom	Richard Graham	Member of Parliament of the United Kingdom for Gloucester and Trade Envoy to the Philippines representative of Prime Minister Boris Johnson and the Government of the United Kingdom	
United States	Douglas Emhoff	Second Gentleman of the United States representative of President Joe Biden and the U.S. Government	
United States	Bobby Scott	U.S. Representative for Virginia's 3rd congressional district	
United States	Nani A. Coloretti	Deputy Director of the U.S. Office of Management and Budget	
United States	Admiral James A. Winnefeld Jr. (Ret.)	former U.S. Vice Chairman of the Joint Chiefs of Staff	
United States	Chantale Wong	U.S. Director of the Asian Development Bank	
Vietnam	Võ Thị Ánh Xuân	Vice President of Vietnam	

=== Post-inaugural events ===
Following the ceremony, a vin d'honneur was held inside the National Museum of Fine Arts. Marcos returned to Malacañang Palace for arrival honors and to lead the mass oath-taking of his Cabinet. The inaugural dinner was also held inside Malacañang. A “People’s Concert” took place at around 9 p.m. at Mendiola Street near the palace.

=== Protests ===
The PNP relayed that protests would be allowed but not near the inauguration venue. They were allowed to hold protests in government-designated freedom parks. In Manila, there are four such venues, namely Plaza Miranda, Plaza Dilao, Plaza Moriones, and the Liwasang Bonifacio.

On the day of the inauguration, an anti-Marcos protest was held by the leftist group Bagong Alyansang Makabayan at 10 a.m. at Plaza Miranda. The group originally planned to use the Liwasang Bonifacio but moved to prevent a clash between them and pro-Marcos supporters, who had gathered at the venue.

== Sara Duterte's inaugural ceremony ==
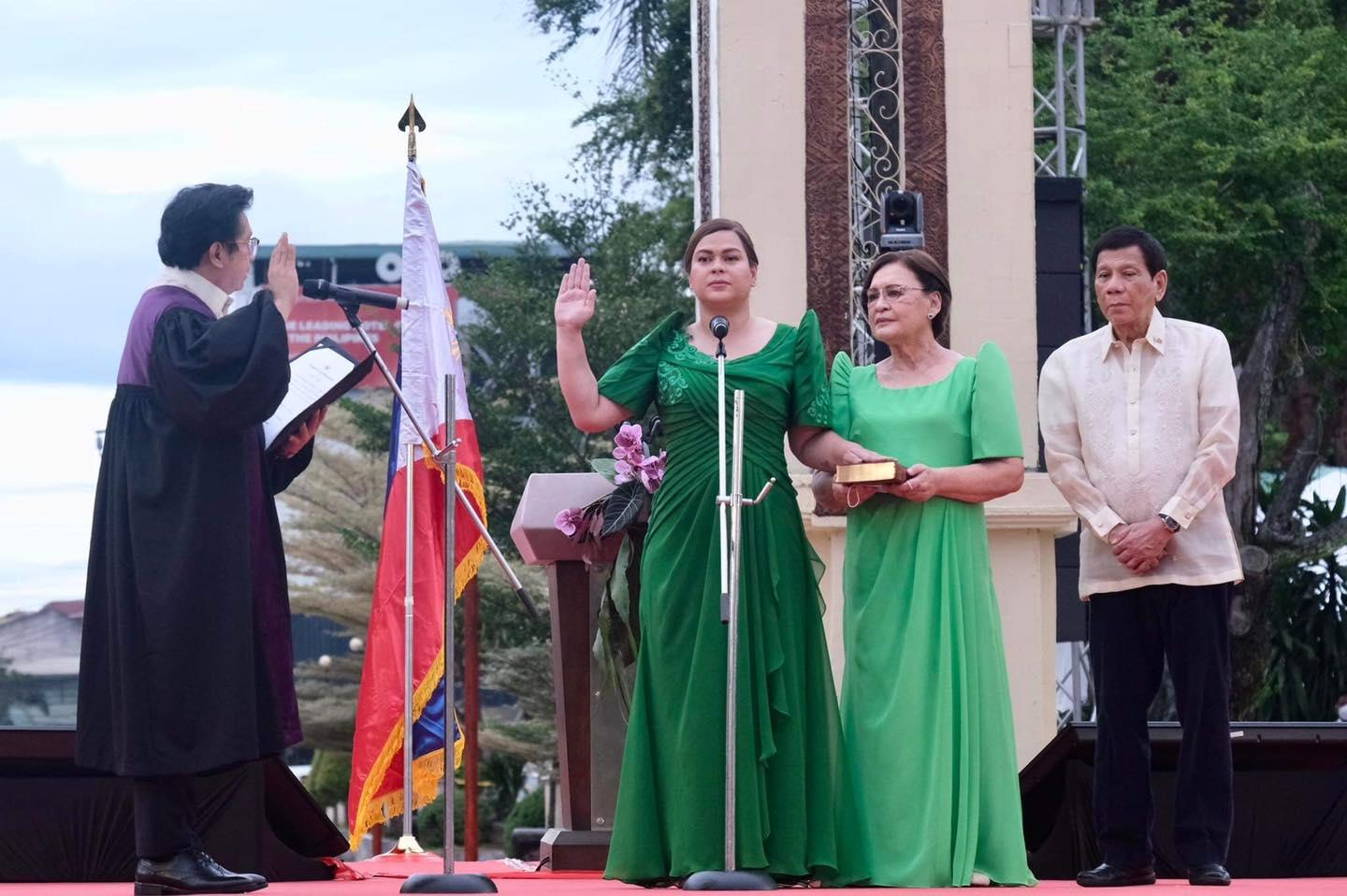
Sara Duterte’s oath of office to Associate Justice Ramon Paul Hernando and accompanied by her parents, Elizabeth Zimmerman and President Rodrigo Duterte.

The oath-taking of vice president-elect Sara Duterte was held on June 19, 2022, at the San Pedro Square near the city hall of Davao City, the first vice presidential inauguration to be held in Mindanao. Duterte scheduled her ceremony earlier so that she could attend Marcos's inauguration. She still assumed the vice presidency only on June 30 as per law. At Duterte's request, the oath-taking was administered by Associate Justice Ramon Paul Hernando, her former professor at San Beda College of Law.

The event started with a Catholic Mass at Davao Cathedral presided over by Davao Archbishop Romulo Valles. The oath-taking of Duterte was administered by Justice Hernando at 5:13 p.m. PST (UTC+08). Her mother, Elizabeth Zimmerman, held the Bible, while her father, outgoing president Rodrigo Duterte, stood as witness. In her inaugural address, Duterte emphasized the importance of serving the country and national unity. She recalled her journey from being an aspiring medical practitioner to Davao City mayor and eventually vice president, and urged Filipinos to heed the call of public service. Duterte also highlighted the problems facing the youth and the role of families in education. She also called for unity to address the challenges faced by the country.

Around 200 people attended her inauguration. Notable guests included the Duterte family, president-elect Marcos and his family, former president Gloria Macapagal Arroyo, and several senators and diplomats. Outgoing vice president Leni Robredo was invited but declined to attend as she was in her home city of Naga for the city's charter day. The ceremony ended with a "Musikahan: Pasasalamat" concert featuring Andrew E, Isay Alvarez, and Robert Seña.

== Gallery ==
Oath taking and Inaugural address
