= President of the Philippines =

Head of state and government

- Pangulo ng Pilipinas
- Presidential seal

- Presidential standard

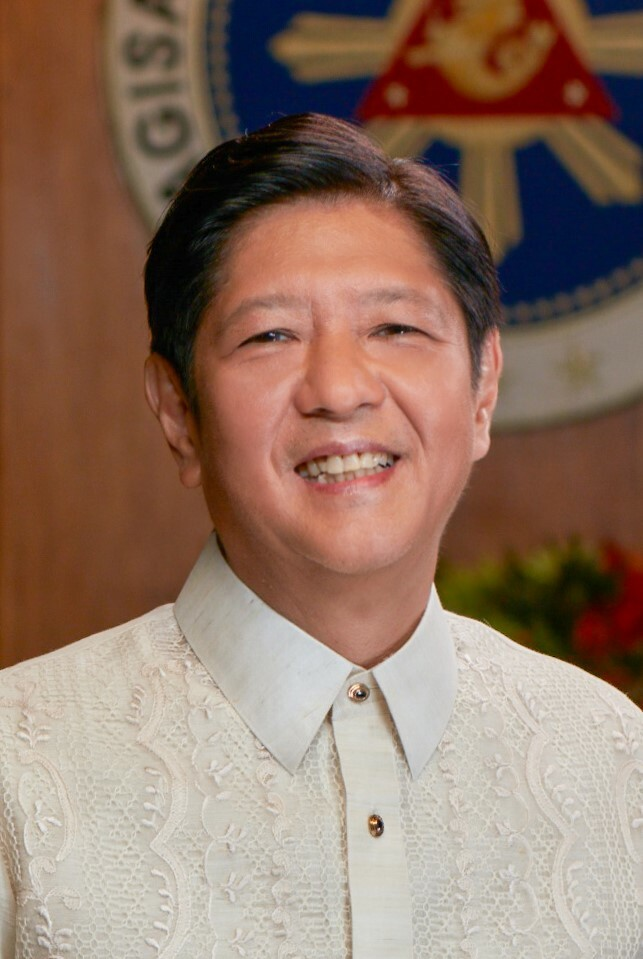
- Incumbent; Bongbong Marcos since June 30, 2022
- Government of the Philippines; Office of the President
- Style: Mr. President (informal); The Honorable (formal); His Excellency (diplomatic)
- Type: Head of state Head of government Commander-in-chief
- Member of: Cabinet; National Security Council
- Residence: Malacañang Palace
- Seat: San Miguel, Manila, Philippines
- Appointer: Direct popular vote or by succession from vice presidency
- Term length: Six years, non renewable
- Constituting instrument: Constitution of the Philippines (1987)
- Precursor: Governor-General; Prime Minister (Note: As head of government.)
- Inaugural holder: Emilio Aguinaldo (official) (Note: The position was created by an independent revolutionary state, the "Malolos Republic", but was not recognized internationally. The Philippine government now recognizes the Malolos Republic as its predecessor state, which it also calls the First Philippine Republic.); Manuel L. Quezon (official) (Note: From an international standpoint at that time, the First Philippine Republic never existed but rather, Spain ceded its Spanish East Indies to the United States of America by the Treaty of Paris following the Spanish–American War. Therefore, the international community only recognizes the first Philippine presidency under the US-associated Commonwealth of the Philippines.)
- Formation: January 23, 1899; 127 years ago (Republic; official); November 15, 1935; 90 years ago (Commonwealth; official)
- First holder: Emilio Aguinaldo
- Salary: ₱411,382/US$ 7,409 per month (Note: The Department of Budget and Management (DBM) has indicated on their website that the president's salary grade is the 33rd. The 33rd salary grade on COMELEC's website states 395,858 pesos.)
- Website: president.gov.ph (former website) op-proper.gov.ph pbbm.com.ph

President of the Philippines (Filipino: Pangulo ng Pilipinas, sometimes referred to as Presidente ng Pilipinas) is the title of the head of state, head of government and chief executive of the Philippines. The president leads the executive branch of the Philippine government and is the commander-in-chief of the Armed Forces of the Philippines.

The president is directly elected by the citizens of the Philippines and is one of only two nationally elected executive officials, the other being the vice president of the Philippines. However, four vice presidents have assumed the presidency without having been elected to the office, by virtue of a president's intra-term death or resignation. (Note: The four vice presidents who succeeded to the presidency upon their predecessor's death or resignation and finished-out that unexpired term are: Sergio Osmeña (1944); Elpidio Quirino (1948); Carlos P. Garcia (1957); and Gloria Macapagal Arroyo (2001).)

Filipinos generally refer to their president as pangulo or presidente in their local language. The president is limited to a single six-year term. According to Article VII, Section 4 of the 1987 Philippine Constitution, the president "shall not be eligible for any reelection" and that, "no person who has succeeded as president and has served as such for more than four years shall be qualified for election to the same office at any time." This constitutional limitation, however, was not violated in the case of Gloria Macapagal Arroyo, although she served as president for 9 years, 5 months, and 29 days, from 2001 to 2004 (three and a half years), after taking over the office of President Joseph Estrada, who was ousted after the Second EDSA Revolution, and from 2004 until 2010 when she served as the elected president in her own right.

The current president of the Philippines is Bongbong Marcos, who was sworn in on June 30, 2022, at the National Museum of Fine Arts (formerly the Legislative Building).

== Title ==
The official title of the Philippine head of state and government is "President of the Philippines." The title in Filipino is Pangulo (cognate of Malay penghulu "leader", "chieftain"). In the other major languages of the Philippines such as the Bisayan languages, presidente is more common when Filipinos are not actually code-switching with the English word. The honorific for the president is "Your Excellency" or "His/Her Excellency." During his tenure, President Rodrigo Duterte broke precedent by not using the honorific, opting to drop the title in all official communications, events or materials.

=== Historical titles ===
The presidency of the Philippines, as a democratically elected office, was established with the title of "President of the Republic" in the 1899 Constitution, continuing until the suppression of the independent Philippine state by the United States. The term "President of the Republic of the Philippines" used under Japanese occupation of the Philippines distinguished the government of then-president José P. Laurel from the Commonwealth government-in-exile under President Manuel L. Quezon. The restoration of the Commonwealth in 1945 and the withdrawal of American sovereignty in 1946 restored the title of "President of the Philippines" enacted in the 1935 Constitution, this time applying the title to the president of a sovereign state. The 1973 Constitution, though generally referring to the president as "President of the Philippines", once reused the term "President of the Republic" in Article XVII, Section 12. In the text of Proclamation No. 1081 that placed the country under martial law in September 1972, President Ferdinand Marcos consistently referred to himself as "President of the Philippines."

== History ==
=== Early republics ===
==== Bonifacio's Tagalog Republic ====
Depending on the definition chosen for these terms, a number of persons could alternatively be considered the inaugural holder of the office. Andrés Bonifacio could be considered the president of the Tagalog provinces, while he was the third Supreme President (Spanish: Presidente Supremo; Filipino: Kataas-taasang Pangulo) of the Katipunan, a secret revolutionary society that started an open revolt against the Spanish colonial government in August 1896, he transformed the society into a revolutionary government with himself as "President of the Sovereign Nation/People" (Filipino: Pangulo ng Haring Bayan). While the term Katipunan (and the title "Supreme President") remained, Bonifacio's government was also known as the Tagalog Republic (Spanish: República Tagala; Filipino: Republika ng Katagalugan), and the term haring bayan or haringbayan as an adaptation and synonym of "republic", from its Latin roots as res publica. Since Presidente Supremo was shortened to Supremo in contemporary historical accounts of other people, he thus became known by that title alone in traditional Philippine historiography, which by itself was thus understood to mean "Supreme Leader" in contrast to the later "Presidents". However, as noted by Filipino historian Xiao Chua, Bonifacio did not refer himself as Supremo but rather as Kataas-taasang Pangulo (Supreme President), Pangulo ng Kataas-taasang Kapulungan (President of the Supreme Assembly), or Pangulo ng Haring Bayan (President of the Sovereign Nation/People), as evidenced by his own writings.

Although the word Tagalog refers to the Tagalog people, a specific ethno-linguistic group mostly in southern Luzon, Bonifacio used the term "Tagalog" in "Tagalog Republic" to denote all non-Spanish peoples of the Philippines in place of Filipinos, which had colonial origins, referring to his concept of the Philippine nation and people as the "Sovereign Tagalog Nation/People" or more precisely "Sovereign Nation of the Tagalog People" (Filipino: Haring Bayang Katagalugan), in effect a synonym of "Tagalog Republic" or more precisely "Republic of the Tagalog Nation/People".

According to Filipino historian Ambeth Ocampo, including Bonifacio as a past president would imply that Macario Sakay and Miguel Malvar should also be included, as Sakay continued Bonifacio's concept of a national Tagalog Republic, and Malvar continued the Philippine Republic which was the culmination of several governments headed by Emilio Aguinaldo that superseded Bonifacio's, Malvar taking over after Aguinaldo's capture. Nevertheless, there are still calls, including from a descendant of Bonifacio, to let Bonifacio be recognized by the current government as the first Philippine president. In 1993, historians Milagros Guerrero, Emmanuel Encarnacion and Ramon Villegas petitioned before the National Historical Institute (now the National Historical Commission of the Philippines) to recognize Bonifacio as the first Philippine president but the institute turned down the petition and reasoned that Bonifacio was not even the Katipunan's first Supremo, but rather Deodato Arellano.

In 2013, the Manila City Council passed a resolution persuading the national government to declare Bonifacio as the first president of the Tagalog Republic, attributing to all natives of the archipelago of the Philippines. A separate resolution was also signed in 2013 by the Philippine Historian Association urging then Philippine President Benigno Aquino III to recognize Bonifacio as the first Philippine president. In the same year, representatives of the Philippine House of Representatives passed a house resolution that sought to acknowledge Bonifacio as the first president. A similar house resolution was also filed in 2016.

According to Marlon Cadiz of the NHCP, the agency is waiting for a thorough and clear study containing new evidence as well as explanations of experts regarding Bonifacio's status as the first president.

==== Aguinaldo's governments and the First Republic ====
In March 1897, during the Philippine Revolution against Spain, Emilio Aguinaldo was elected president of a new revolutionary government at the Tejeros Convention in Tejeros, Cavite. The new government was meant to replace the Katipunan. It variously called itself the "Philippine Republic" (Spanish: Republica Filipina), "Republic of the Philippines" (Spanish: Republica de Filipinas) and "Government of All Tagalogs" or "Government of the Whole Tagalog Nation/People" (Filipino: Pamahalaan ng Sangkatagalugan).

Months later, Aguinaldo was again elected president at Biak-na-Bato, Bulacan in November, leading a reorganized "Republic of the Philippines" (Spanish: Republica de Filipinas), commonly known today as the Republic of Biak-na-Bato. Aguinaldo therefore signed the Pact of Biak-na-Bato and went into exile in Hong Kong at the end of 1897.

In April 1898, the Spanish–American War broke out, and afterwards, the Asiatic Squadron of the United States Navy sailed for the Philippines. At the Battle of Manila Bay on May 1, 1898, the American Navy decisively defeated the Spanish Navy. Aguinaldo subsequently returned to the Philippines aboard a U.S. Navy vessel and renewed the revolution. He formed a dictatorial government on May 24, 1898, and issued the Philippine Declaration of Independence on June 12, 1898. During this brief period he took the title "Dictator" and the Declaration of Independence refers to him as such.

On June 23, 1898, Aguinaldo transformed his dictatorial government into a revolutionary government and became known as "President" again. This form of government provided for the creation of a Revolutionary Congress that was empowered to draft a democratic constitution. The new constitution, promulgated on January 20, 1899, provided for an executive power headed by a President of the Republic, both head of state and head of government, elected by the unicameral legislature and "special representatives" He was elected President of the Republic in accordance with its provisions, and on January 23, 1899, the Philippine Republic (Spanish: Republica Filipina), was inaugurated, with Aguinaldo likewise being inaugurated as President of the Republic. This state is today officially considered to be the proper "first republic" and is also called the Malolos Republic, after its capital Malolos in Bulacan; its congress (formally "National Assembly") and constitution are commonly known as the Malolos Congress and Malolos Constitution as well.

Like all of its predecessors and would-be successors until the 1935 Commonwealth of the Philippines, the First Philippine Republic was short-lived and never internationally recognized, and never controlled or was universally recognized by the entire area covered by the current republic, though it claimed to represent and govern the entire Philippine archipelago and all its people. Control over the Philippines was transferred from Spain to the United States by the Treaty of Paris of 1898, signed in December of that year. The Philippine–American War broke out between the United States and the Philippines over American assertions of sovereignty. The Philippine state effectively ceased to exist on April 1, 1901, after he pledged allegiance to the United States following his capture by U.S. forces in March.

The current government of the Republic of the Philippines considers Emilio Aguinaldo to be the first president of the Philippines-based specifically on his presidency of the Malolos Republic, not any of his various prior governments.

==== Other claimants ====
Miguel Malvar continued Aguinaldo's leadership of the Philippine Republic after the latter's capture until his own capture in 1902, while Macario Sakay revived the Tagalog Republic in 1902 as a continuing state of Bonifacio's Katipunan. They are both considered by some scholars as "unofficial presidents", and along with Bonifacio, are not recognized as presidents by the government.

=== American occupation ===
Between 1898 and 1935, American executive power in the Philippines was exercised by a succession of four military governors-general and eleven civil governors-general.

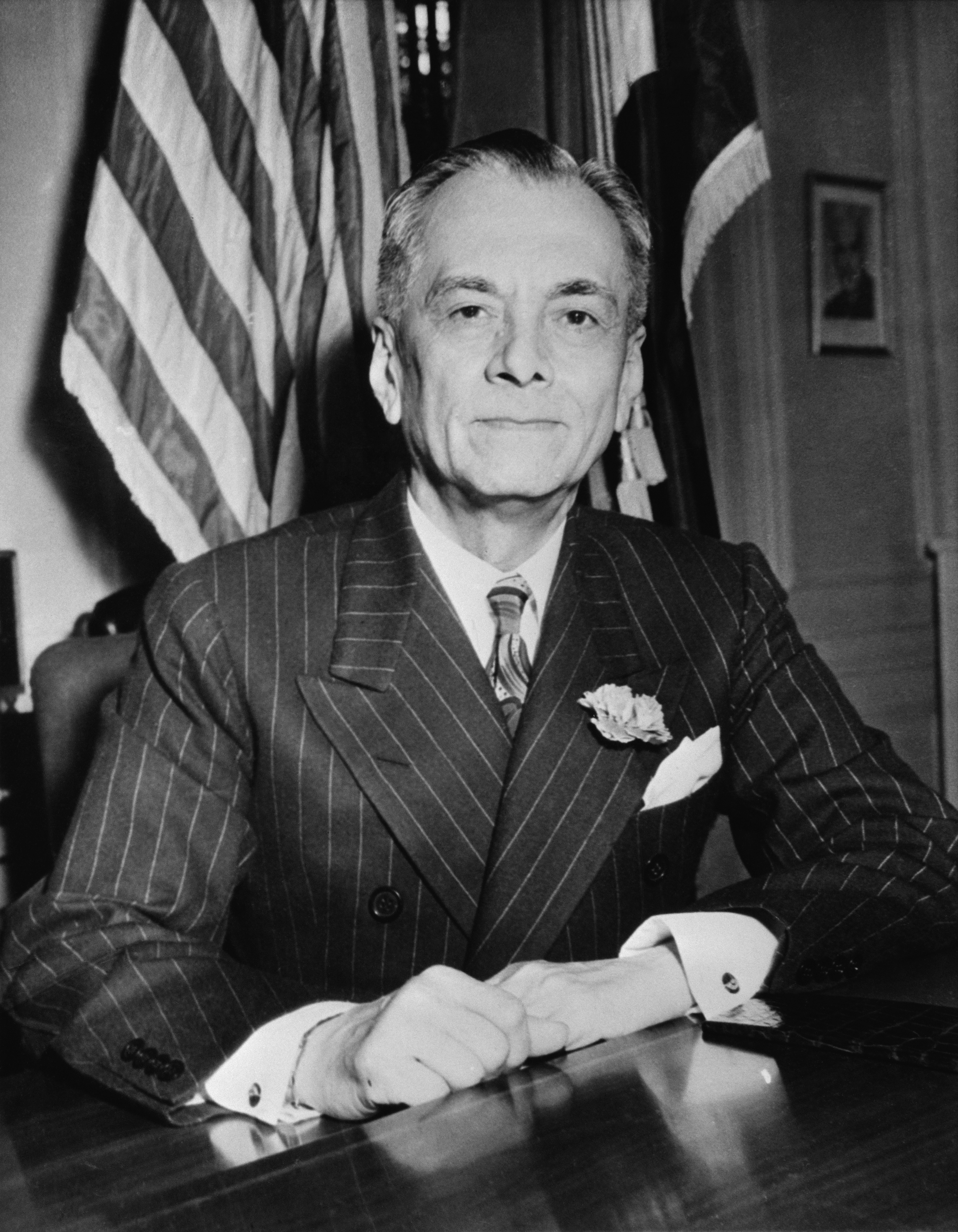
Manuel L. Quezon

=== Philippine Commonwealth ===
In October 1935, Manuel L. Quezon was elected the first president of the Commonwealth of the Philippines, which had been established, still under United States sovereignty, under a constitution ratified on May 14 of that year. During its first five years, the president could serve for a six-year term that cannot be renewed. It was later amended in 1940 to limit a president to serving no more than two four-year terms. When the administration of President Quezon exiled to the United States after the Philippines fell to the Empire of Japan in World War II, Quezon appointed Chief Justice José Abad Santos as his delegate, which in effect the acting president of the Commonwealth according to Justice George A. Malcolm. Abad Santos was subsequently executed by the Imperial Japanese Army on May 2, 1942.

=== The Second Republic under the Japanese ===
On October 14, 1943, José P. Laurel became president under a constitution imposed by the Japanese occupation. Laurel, an associate justice of the Supreme Court of the Philippines, had been instructed to remain in Manila by President Quezon, who withdrew to Corregidor and then to the United States to establish a government in exile in the United States. On August 17, 1945, two days after the Japanese surrendered to the Allies, Laurel officially dissolved the republic.

=== After World War II ===
The 1935 Constitution was restored after the Japanese surrender ended World War II, with Vice President Sergio Osmeña becoming president due to Quezon's death on August 1, 1944. It remained in effect after the United States recognized the sovereignty of the Republic of the Philippines as a separate self-governing nation on July 4, 1946. On the same day, Manuel A. Roxas, the last president of the Commonwealth of the Philippines, became the first president of the independent Republic of the Philippines, also known as the Third Republic of the Philippines.

=== 1973 and 1987 Constitutions ===
A new Constitution ratified on January 17, 1973, under the rule of Ferdinand Marcos introduced a parliamentary-style government. Marcos instituted himself as prime minister while serving as president in 1978. Marcos later appointed César Virata as prime minister in 1981, although, he was only a figurehead as the government control was still with Marcos.

The 1973 Constitution was in effect until the People Power Revolution of 1986 toppled Marcos's 21-year authoritarian regime and replaced him with Corazon C. Aquino. On March 25, 1986, Aquino issued Proclamation No. 3, s. 1986 or the "freedom constitution" that initially replaced the 1973 Constitution. This provisional constitution was done as Aquino was installed as president through revolutionary means. Proclamation No. 3 abrogated many of the provisions of the then 1973 Constitution, including the provisions associated with the Marcos regime, which gave the president legislative powers, as well as the unicameral legislature called the Batasang Pambansa (literally National Legislature in Filipino). The proclamation retained only parts of the 1973 Constitution that were essential for a return to democratic rule, such as the bill of rights. This constitution was superseded on February 2, 1987, by the present constitution.

=== Other issues ===
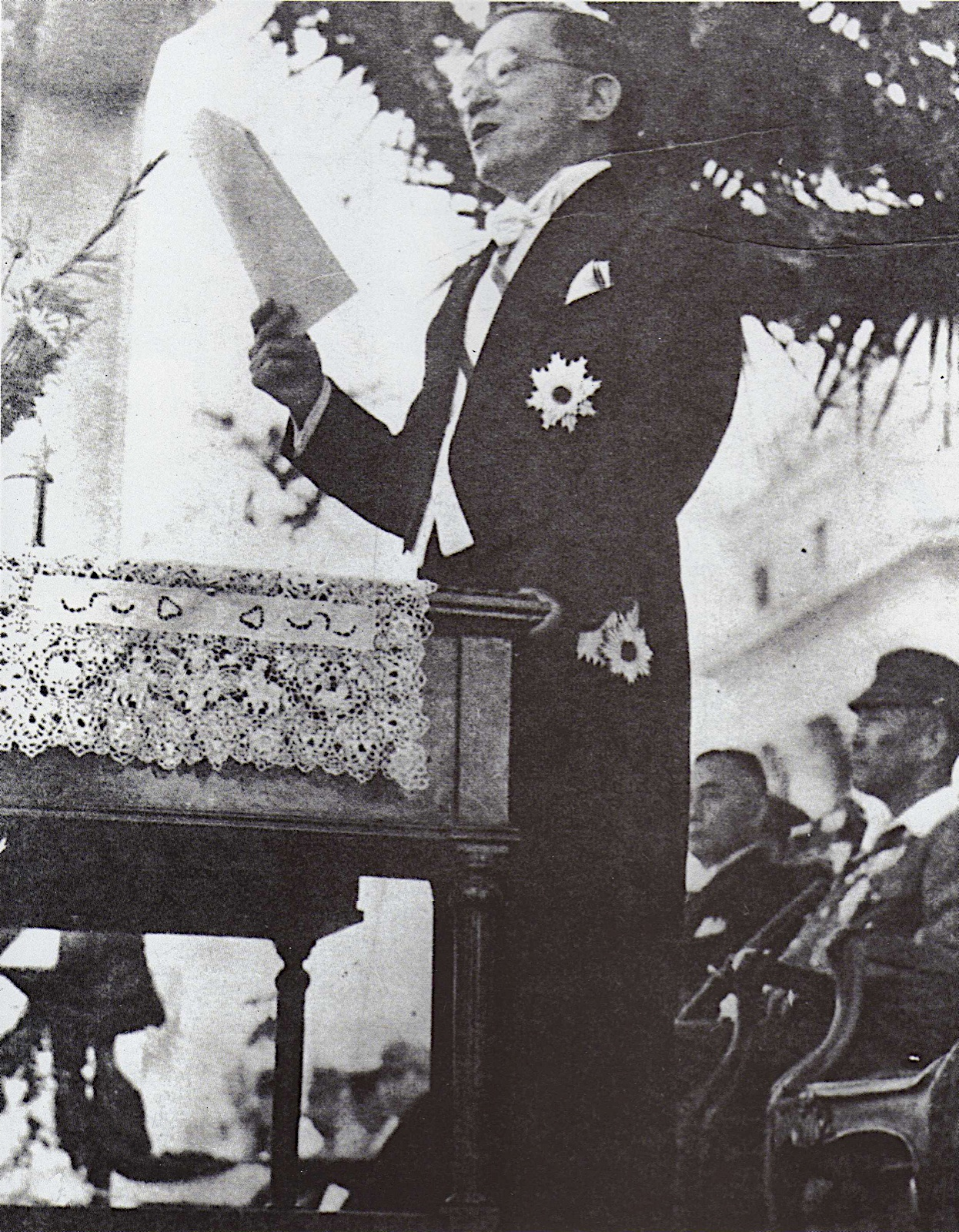
José P. Laurel giving a speech after his inauguration as President of the Second Philippine Republic

Both Bonifacio and Aguinaldo might be considered to have been an inaugural president of an insurgent government. Quezon was the inaugural president of a predecessor state to the current one, while Roxas was the first president of an internationally recognized state.

The government considers Aguinaldo to have been the first president of the Philippines, followed by Quezon and his successors. Despite the differences in constitutions and government, the line of presidents is considered to be continuous. For instance, Rodrigo Duterte, is considered to be the 16th president.

While the government may consider Aguinaldo as the first president, the United States claimed nominal jurisdiction over the territory of the First Republic due to the 1898 Treaty of Paris which ended the Spanish–American War; the United States thus does not consider his tenure to have been legitimate. Manuel L. Quezon is considered to be the first president by the United States when they granted independence through the Tydings–McDuffie Act. He is also the first to win a popular election and a nationwide election.

During the Second World War, the Philippines had two presidents heading two governments. One was Quezon and the Commonwealth government-in-exile in Washington, D.C., and the other was Manila-based Laurel heading the Japanese-sponsored Second Republic. Notably, Laurel was himself instructed to remain in Manila by President Quezon. Laurel and Aguinaldo were not formally recognized as Philippine presidents until Diosdado Macapagal's administration. Their inclusion in the official list coincided with the transfer of the official date of Independence Day from July 4 (the anniversary of the Philippines' independence from the United States) to June 12 (the anniversary of the 1898 Declaration of Independence).

== Powers and roles ==
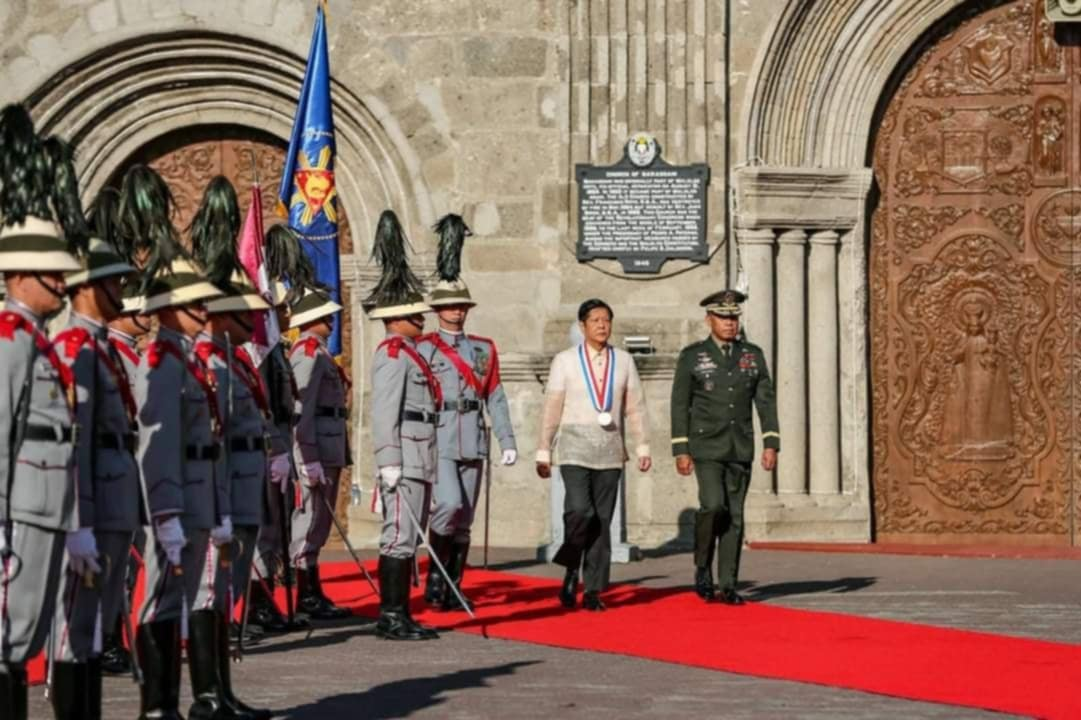
125th anniversary celebration of the First Philippine Republic was commemorated at Barasoain Church in Malolos, Bulacan.

=== Executive power ===
The president of the Philippines, being the chief executive, serves as both the head of state and head of government of the Philippines. The constitution vests the executive power with the president who consequently heads the government's executive branch, including the Cabinet and all executive departments. There are also government agencies that report to no specific department but are instead under the Office of the President. The president also exercises general supervision over local government units.

The president has the power to give executive issuances, which are means to streamline the policy and programs of an administration. There are six issuances that the President may issue, as defined in the Administrative Code of 1987: executive orders, administrative orders, proclamations, memorandum orders, memorandum circulars, and general or special orders.

The president has power to grant reprieves, commutations and pardons, and remit fines and forfeitures after conviction by final judgment, except in cases of impeachment. The president can grant amnesty with the concurrence of the majority of all the members of the Congress. The president has authority to contract or guarantee foreign loans on behalf of the country but only with the prior concurrence of the Monetary Board and subject to such limitations as may be provided by law.

The president has the authority to exercise the power of eminent domain. The president also has the power to direct escheat or reversion proceedings and the power to reserve lands of the public and private domain of the government. However, there are two constitutional provisions that limit the exercise of such power: Article III, Section 9 of the Constitution provides that no person shall be deprived of his/her life, liberty, or property without due process of law and that private property shall not be taken for public use without just compensation.

With the consent of the Commission on Appointments, the president also appoints the heads of the executive departments, board of members and its leaders from any national government-related institutions, ambassadors, other public ministers and consuls, high-ranking officers of the armed forces, and other officials. The members of the Supreme Court and lower courts are also appointed by the president, but only from the list of nominees prepared by the Judicial and Bar Council. Such appointments do not need the approval of the Commission on Appointments.

=== Legislative power ===
As per Article VI, Section 1 of the Constitution, the power of lawmaking is vested in the bicameral Congress, which consists of the Senate and the House of Representatives. However, the president has some legislative power. The president has the power to veto any bill passed by Congress. Article VI, Section 27 requires that every legislation passed by Congress shall be presented to the president, after which the president can either sign the bill into law within thirty days, veto the bill, or take no action within the timeframe, in which the bill will pass as if it had been signed. While Congress can override a presidential veto, it requires a two-thirds vote of both houses. The president can also veto any particular item or items in an appropriation, revenue, or tariff bill, but the veto shall not affect the item or items to which he does not object. By exerting their influence on Congress, the president can shape legislation and be involved in the legislative process. The State of the Nation Address also gives the president an opportunity to outline their priority legislative agenda.

== Election process ==
=== Eligibility ===
Article VII, Section 2 of the Constitution sets the following qualifications for holding the presidency:

- be a natural-born citizen of the Philippines
- be a registered voter
- be able to read and write
- at least forty years of age on the day of the election
- a resident of the Philippines for at least ten years immediately preceding such election.

Natural-born Filipinos are citizens of the Philippines from birth without having to perform any act to acquire or perfect their Philippine citizenship. Those whose fathers or mothers are citizens of the Philippines at the time of their birth and those born before January 17, 1973, of Filipino mothers, who elect Philippine citizenship upon reaching the age of majority are considered natural-born Filipinos.

The Constitution also provides term limits where the president is ineligible for reelection and a person who has succeeded as president and has served as such for more than four years will be ineligible to be elected for a second term. However, with the case of Joseph Estrada who was elected president in 1998, deposed in 2001, and again ran for the presidency in 2010, the Constitution's wording where "[the] President shall not be eligible for any re-election" remains unclear as his case was never brought to the Supreme Court. It remains unclear whether the term limit of no re-election applies only to the incumbent president or for any person who has been elected as president.

=== Election ===
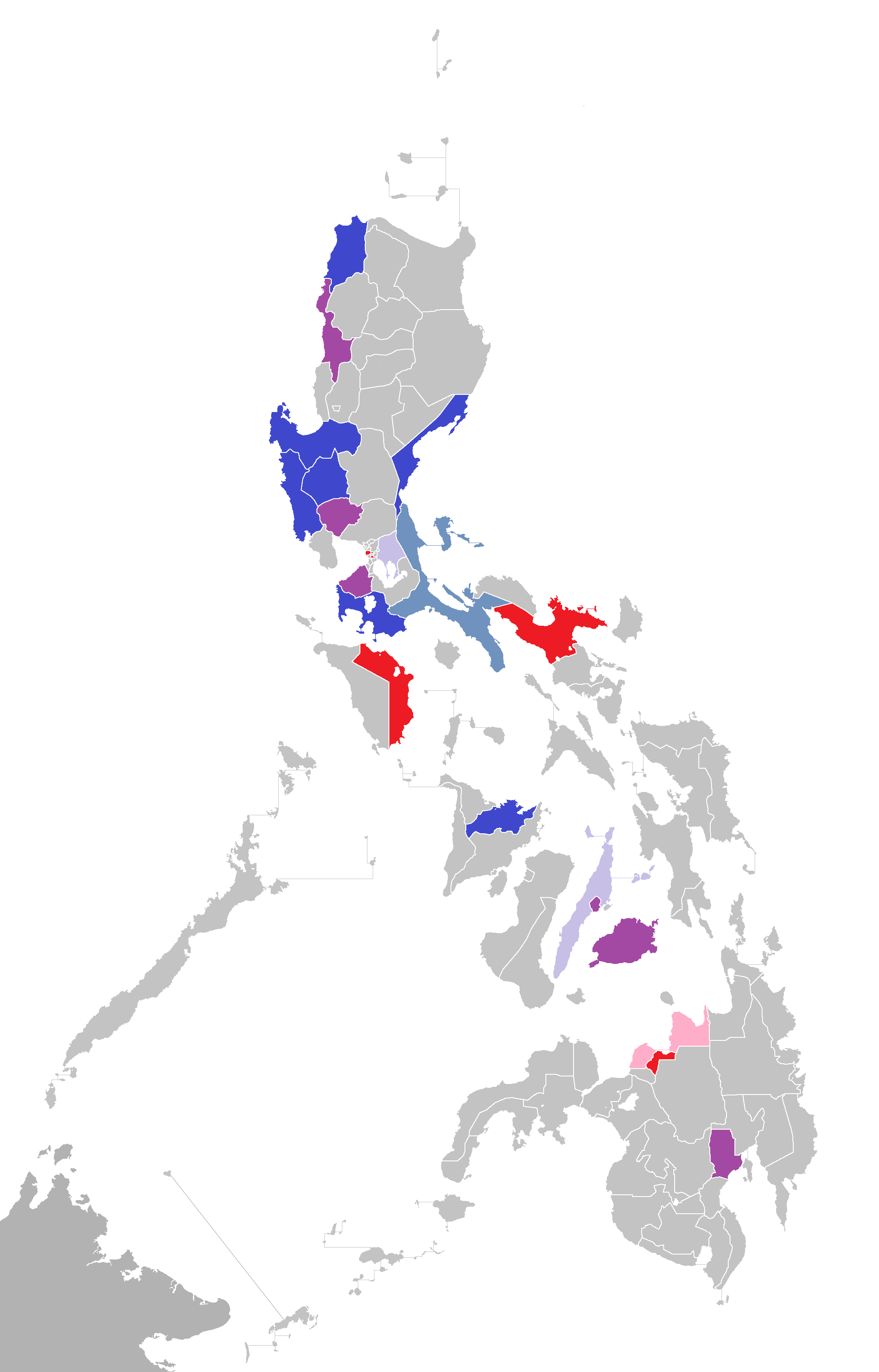
Home provinces (blue and purple) of the presidents.

The president is elected by direct vote every six years, usually on the second Monday of May. The latest election was held in 2022.

The returns of every election for president and vice president, duly certified by the board of canvassers of each province or city, shall be transmitted to Congress, directed to the president of the Senate. Upon receipt of the certificates of canvass, the president of the Senate shall open all the certificates in the presence of a joint public session of Congress not later than 30 days after election day. Congress then canvasses the votes upon determining that the polls are authentic and were done in the manner provided by law.

The person with the highest number of votes is declared the winner, but in case two or more have the highest number of votes, the president is elected by a majority of all members of Congress, with the Senate and the House of Representatives voting separately.

=== Inauguration ===
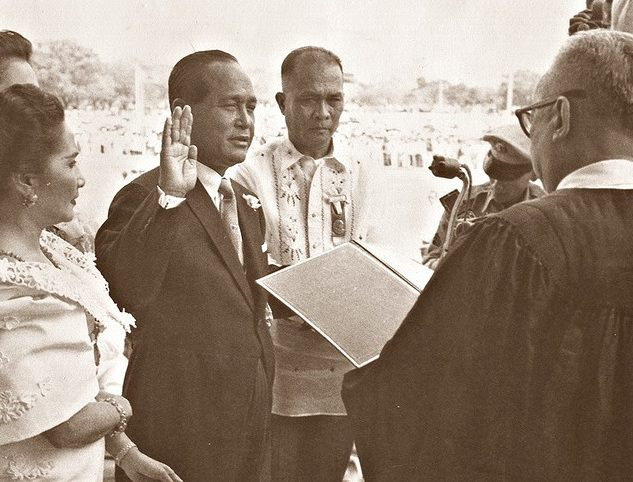
Carlos P. Garcia is sworn in as the eighth president of the Philippines after winning the election of 1957

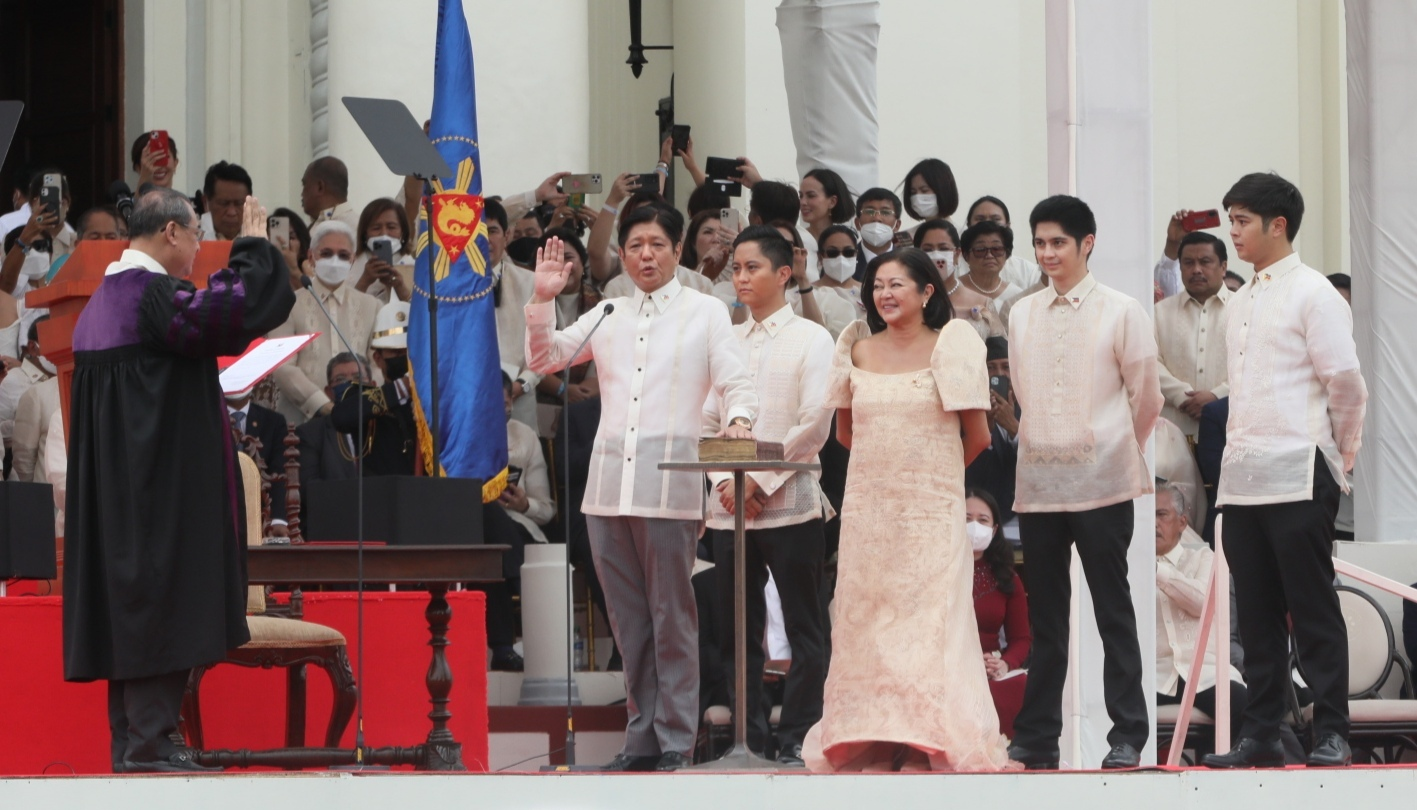
Bongbong Marcos during his inauguration

The president of the Philippines usually takes the oath of office at noon of June 30 following the presidential election. Traditionally, the vice president takes the oath first, a little before noon for two reasons. First, according to protocol, no one follows the president (who is last due to his supremacy), and second, to establish a constitutionally valid successor before the president-elect accedes. During Quezon's inauguration, however, the vice president and legislature were sworn in after the president, to symbolize a new start.

Custom has enshrined three places as the traditional venue for the inauguration ceremony: Barasoain Church in Malolos City, Bulacan; in front of the old Legislative Building (now part of the National Museum) in Manila; or at Quirino Grandstand, where most have been held. Some presidential have broken precedent, either due to extraordinary circumstances or other reasons. For example, in 2004, Gloria Macapagal Arroyo delivered her pre-inaugural address at Quirino Grandstand, took the oath of office in Cebu City before Chief Justice Hilario Davide Jr., and the next day held the first cabinet meeting in Butuan. Her reasoning for breaking with precedent is that she wanted to celebrate her inauguration in each of the three main island groups of the Philippines: Luzon, Visayas, and Mindanao. Her first inauguration also broke precedent as she was sworn in at the EDSA Shrine on January 20, 2001, during the Second EDSA Revolution that removed Joseph Estrada from office.

The dress code at the modern inaugural ceremony is traditional, formal Filipino clothing, which is otherwise loosely termed Filipiniana. Ladies must wear baro't saya (the formal wear of other indigenous groups is permissible), while men don the barong tagalog. Non-Filipinos at the ceremony may wear their respective versions of formal dress, but foreign diplomats have often been seen donning Filipiniana as a mark of cultural respect.

The Constitution provides the following oath or affirmation for the president and vice president-elect which must be taken before they enter into office:

"I, (name), do solemnly swear [or affirm], that I will faithfully and conscientiously fulfill my duties as President [or Vice-President or Acting President] of the Philippines. Preserve and defend its Constitution, execute its laws, do justice to every man, and consecrate myself to the service of the Nation. So help me God." [In case of affirmation, last sentence will be omitted.]

— Constitution of the Philippines, art. 7, sec. 5

The Filipino text of the oath used for the inaugurations of Fidel V. Ramos, Joseph Estrada, Benigno Aquino III, and Bongbong Marcos reads:

"Ako si (pangalan), ay taimtim kong pinanunumpaan (o pinatototohanan) na tutuparin ko nang buong katapatan at sigasig ang aking mga tungkulin bilang Pangulo (o Pangalawang Pangulo o Nanunungkulang Pangulo) ng Pilipinas, pangangalagaan at ipagtatanggol ang kanyang Konstitusyon, ipatutupad ang mga batas nito, magiging makatarungan sa bawat tao, at itatalaga ang aking sarili sa paglilingkod sa Bansa. Kasihan nawa ako ng Diyos." (Kapag pagpapatotoo, ang huling pangungusap ay kakaltasin.)

— Konstitusyon ng Pilipinas, Artikulo VII, SEK. 5

As soon as the president takes the oath of office, a 21-gun salute is fired to salute the new head of state, and the presidential anthem "We Say Mabuhay" is played. The president delivers his inaugural address, and then proceeds to Malacañang Palace to climb the Grand Staircase, a ritual which symbolizes the formal possession of the palace. The president then inducts the newly formed cabinet into office in one of the state rooms.

== Incumbency ==
=== State of the Nation Address ===
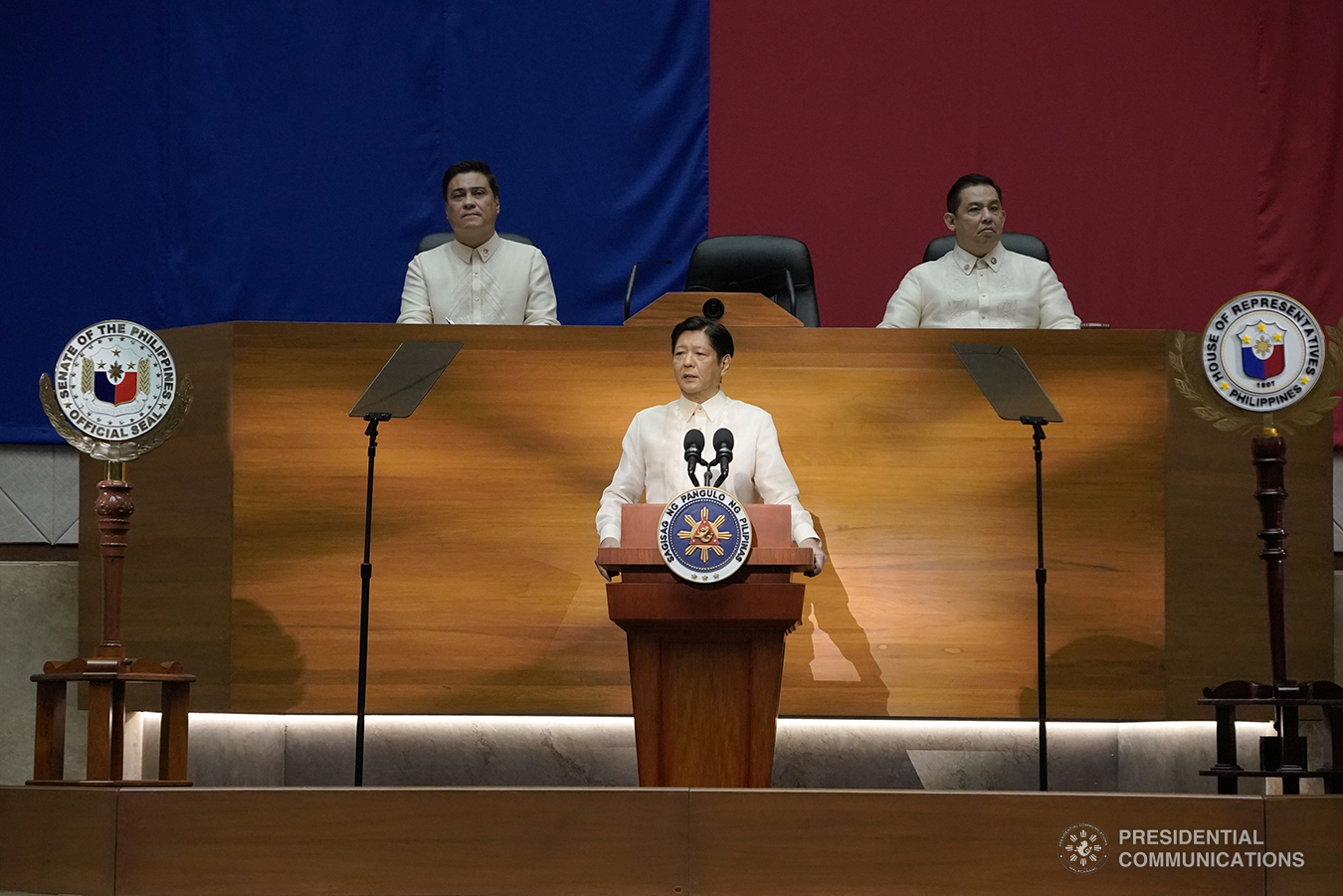
President Bongbong Marcos during his first State of the Nation Address on July 25, 2022.

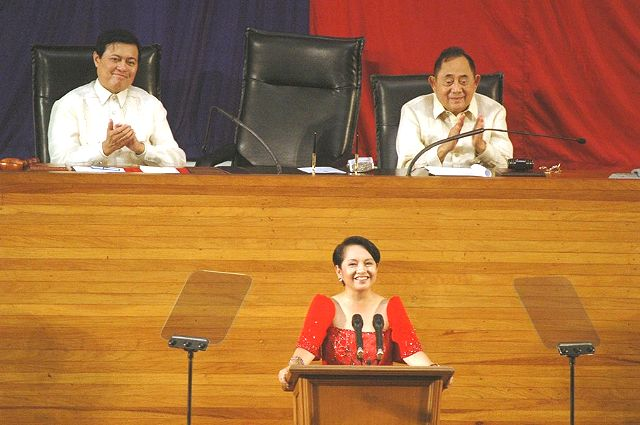
Gloria Macapagal Arroyo delivering her seventh State of the Nation Address at the Batasang Pambansa

The State of the Nation Address (SONA) is an annual event, in which the president reports on the status of the nation, normally to the resumption of a joint session of the House of Representatives and the Senate. This is a duty of the president as stated in Article VII, Section 23 of the 1987 Constitution.

=== Tenure and term limits ===
The 1899 Constitution originally provided for a term of four years, with the president being eligible for re-election, but in practice, the only president elected under this constitution never served a full term. The 1935 Constitution set the president's term at six years, without re-election. In 1940, however, the 1935 Constitution was amended and the term of the president (and vice president) was shortened to four years, with a two-term limit. Under the provisions of the amended 1935 document, only presidents Manuel L. Quezon (1941) and Ferdinand E. Marcos (1969) were re-elected. Presidents Sergio Osmeña (1946), Elpidio Quirino (1953), Carlos P. Garcia (1961) and Diosdado Macapagal (1965) all failed in seeking a new term. Marcos was the only president to serve three terms (1965–1969, 1969–1981, 1981–1986).

On August 24, 1970, Congress enacted RA No. 6132, otherwise known as the Constitutional Convention Act, for the purpose of convening a constitutional convention. The 320 delegates met from June 1971 until November 30, 1972, when they approved the draft of the new Charter. While in the process of drafting a new Constitution, President Ferdinand Marcos declared Martial Law on September 21, 1972. The draft Constitution was submitted to the Citizen's Assemblies from January 10 to 17, 1973 for ratification. On January 17, 1973, President Marcos issued Proclamation No. 1102, announcing the ratification of the Constitution of the Republic of the Philippines. In 1981, President Marcos secured a third term, defeating Alejo Santos in an election.

The 1987 Constitution restored the 1935 Constitution's original ban on presidential reelection. Under Article VII, Section 4 of the current constitution, the term of the president shall begin at noon on the thirtieth day of June next following the day of the election and shall end at noon of the same date, six years thereafter. The incumbent president is not eligible for re-election, even if non-consecutive. Moreover, no president who serves more than four years of a presidential term is allowed to run or serve again.

=== Vacancies and succession ===
==== At the start of the term ====
Under Article VII, Section 7 of the Constitution, In case the president-elect fails to qualify, the vice president-elect shall act as president until the president-elect shall have qualified. If at the beginning of the term of the president, the president-elect shall have died or shall have become permanently disabled, the vice president-elect shall become president. Where no president and vice president shall have been chosen or shall have qualified, or where both shall have died or become permanently disabled, the president of the Senate or, in case of his inability, the speaker of the House of Representatives, shall act as president until a president or a vice president shall have been chosen and qualified.

==== During the term ====
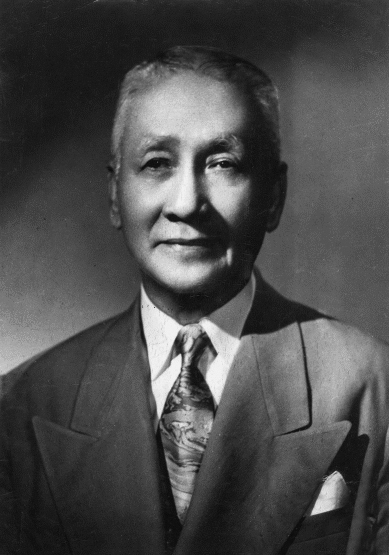
Sergio Osmeña was the first vice president to succeed to the presidency upon the death of a chief executive, who was Manuel L. Quezon, in 1944.

The line of presidential succession as specified by Article VII, Section 8 of the Constitution are the vice president, Senate president and the speaker of the House of Representatives. Contrary to popular belief, the Chief Justice of the Supreme Court of the Philippines is not in the line of succession, but historically, the 1899 Constitution assigned the President of the Supreme Court of Justice as acting President of the Republic should the latter office become vacant. If the offices of both the president and vice president are vacant at the same time, Congress shall within a specific period enact a law calling for a special election. However, if the presidential election is 18 months away, no special election shall be called. An acting president may temporarily assume the duties of president.

The current presidential line of succession is:

No.	Office	Incumbent
1	Vice President	Sara Duterte
2	President of the Senate	Sherwin Gatchalian
3	Speaker of the House of Representatives	Bojie Dy

=== Impeachment ===
Impeachment in the Philippines follows procedures similar to the United States. The House of Representatives, one of the houses of the bicameral Congress, has the exclusive power to initiate all cases of impeachment against the president, vice president, members of the Supreme Court, members of the constitutional commissions and the ombudsman. When a third of its membership has endorsed the impeachment articles, it is then transmitted to the Senate of the Philippines which tries and decide, as impeachment tribunal, the impeachment case. A main difference from U.S. proceedings however is that only a third of House members are required to approve the motion to impeach the president (as opposed to the majority required in the United States). In the Senate, selected members of the House of Representatives act as the prosecutors and the senators act as judges with the Senate president and chief justice of the Supreme Court jointly presiding over the proceedings. Like the United States, to convict the official in question requires that a minimum of two-thirds (i.e., 16 of 24 members) of the senate vote in favor of conviction. If an impeachment attempt is unsuccessful or the official is acquitted, no new cases can be filed against that impeachable official for at least one full year.

The Constitution enumerates the culpable violation of the Constitution, treason, bribery, graft and corruption, other high crimes, and betrayal of public trust as grounds for the impeachment of the president. The same also applies for the vice president, the members of the Supreme Court, the members of the constitutional commissions, and the ombudsman.

=== Official residence ===
Presidential residences

Malacañang Palace, the official residence

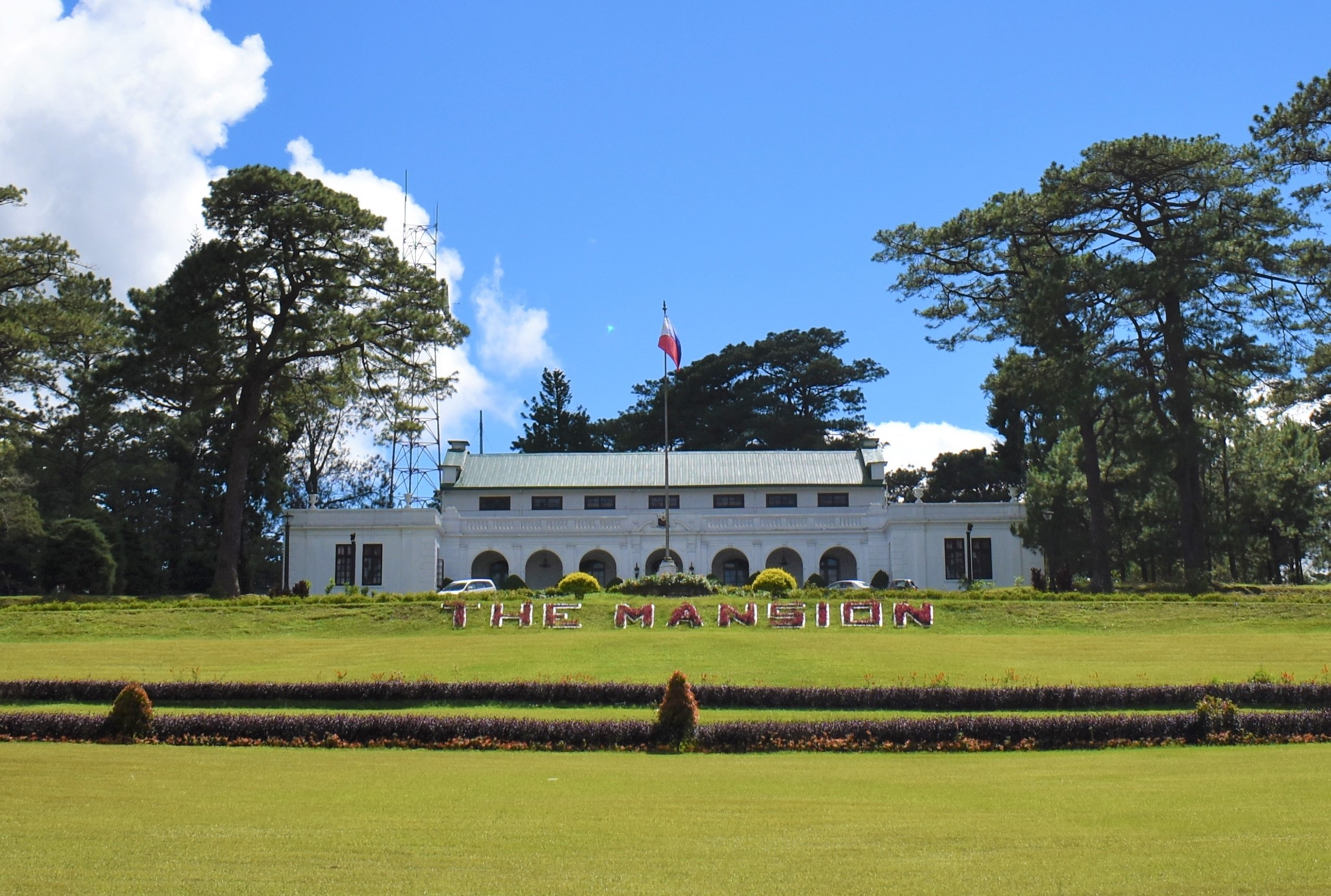
The Mansion, the official summer palace

Malacañang Palace is the official residence of the president of the Philippines, a privilege entitled to him/her under Article VII, Section 6 of the Constitution. The palace is located along the north bank of the Pasig River, along J.P. Laurel Street in the district of San Miguel, Manila. The Filipino name is derived from the Tagalog phrase "may lakán diyán" ("there is a nobleman there"), and this was eventually shortened to Malakanyáng. The complex includes several mansions and office buildings built and designed in the bahay na bato and neoclassical architectural styles.

Before Malacañang Palace was designated as the official residence of the president, various establishments served as residence of the chief executive in the Philippines. The Spanish governor-general, the highest-ranking official in the Philippines during the Spanish Era, resided in the Palacio del Gobernador inside the walled city of Intramuros. However, after an earthquake in 1863, the Palacio del Gobernador was destroyed, and the residence and office of the governor-general was transferred to Malacañang Palace. During the Philippine Revolution, Aguinaldo resided in various places in Cavite before establishing Malolos, Bulacan as capital, and he would be inaugurated as President of the First Republic here. During the Philippine-American War, Aguinaldo successively established new capitals as he retreated northward in the face of invading American forces. When the Americans occupied the Philippines, they also used Malacañang Palace as an official residence for their governors-general. During the Japanese occupation of the Philippines, the presidential seat and government offices were transferred to the more inland Baguio, where the Mansion House was used as the official residence. Meanwhile, President Manuel L. Quezon of the Philippine Commonwealth government-in-exile resided in the Omni Shoreham Hotel in Washington D.C. After the restoration of independence in 1946, plans were made for the construction of the new presidential residence to replace Malacañang in a new capital city. However, the plans did not push through and the president's official residence is still Malacañang Palace in Manila.

A secondary residence within the wider palace grounds is Bahay Pangulo (transl. President's House), formerly known as Bahay Pangarap (transl. House of Dreams) and Bahay ng Pagbabago (transl. House of Change), a smaller structure located on the south bank of the Pasig River across the main palace in Malacañang Park, which is itself part of the Presidential Security Group Complex. President Benigno Aquino III was the first to use Bahay Pangarap as his official residence. It was originally built in the 1930s under President Quezon as a rest house and venue for informal activities and social functions of the First Family. The house was designed by architect Juan Arellano in the 1930s, and underwent several renovations in the early 1960s, 2008, and 2010.

The president also has several other official residences nationwide for official use. The Mansion in Baguio is the official summer palace of the president. The palace was originally built in 1908 to serve as the summer residence for American Governors-General, and later became the holiday home and working office for presidents when the government would temporarily visit Baguio. Malacañang of the South in Davao City is the president's residence in Mindanao. It was built in 2005 on state property and serves as an official residence and base of operations for presidents when visiting Davao and the surrounding provinces. Malacañang sa Sugbo in Cebu City was the former official residence in the Visayas. Originally the local office of the Bureau of Customs (BOC), it was converted to a palace in 2004. It was later returned to the BOC. Malacañang of the North was also an official residence of the president in the Ilocos Region. The residence is currently a presidential museum.

Whenever the President visits the Clark Freeport Zone, they stay at the White House, which was formerly the official residence of the Commanding General of the 13th Air Force during the time Clark was a U.S. Air Force base. President Manuel Roxas after reviewing troops on April 15, 1948, rested in the White House, but would later suffer a heart attack. Roxas death anniversary is commemorated annually at the White House.

=== Travel ===
Philippine Presidential transportation

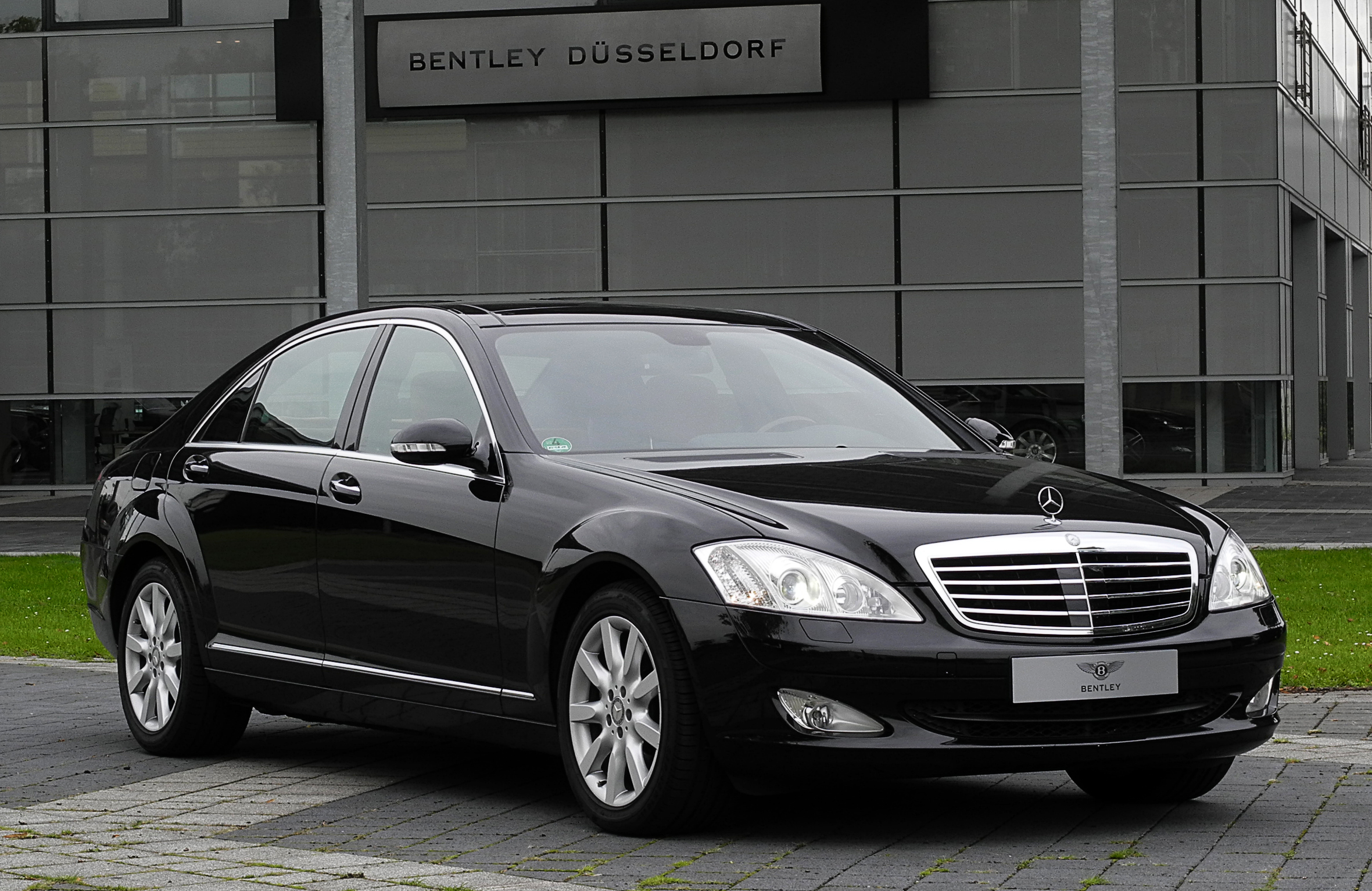
Presidential Car

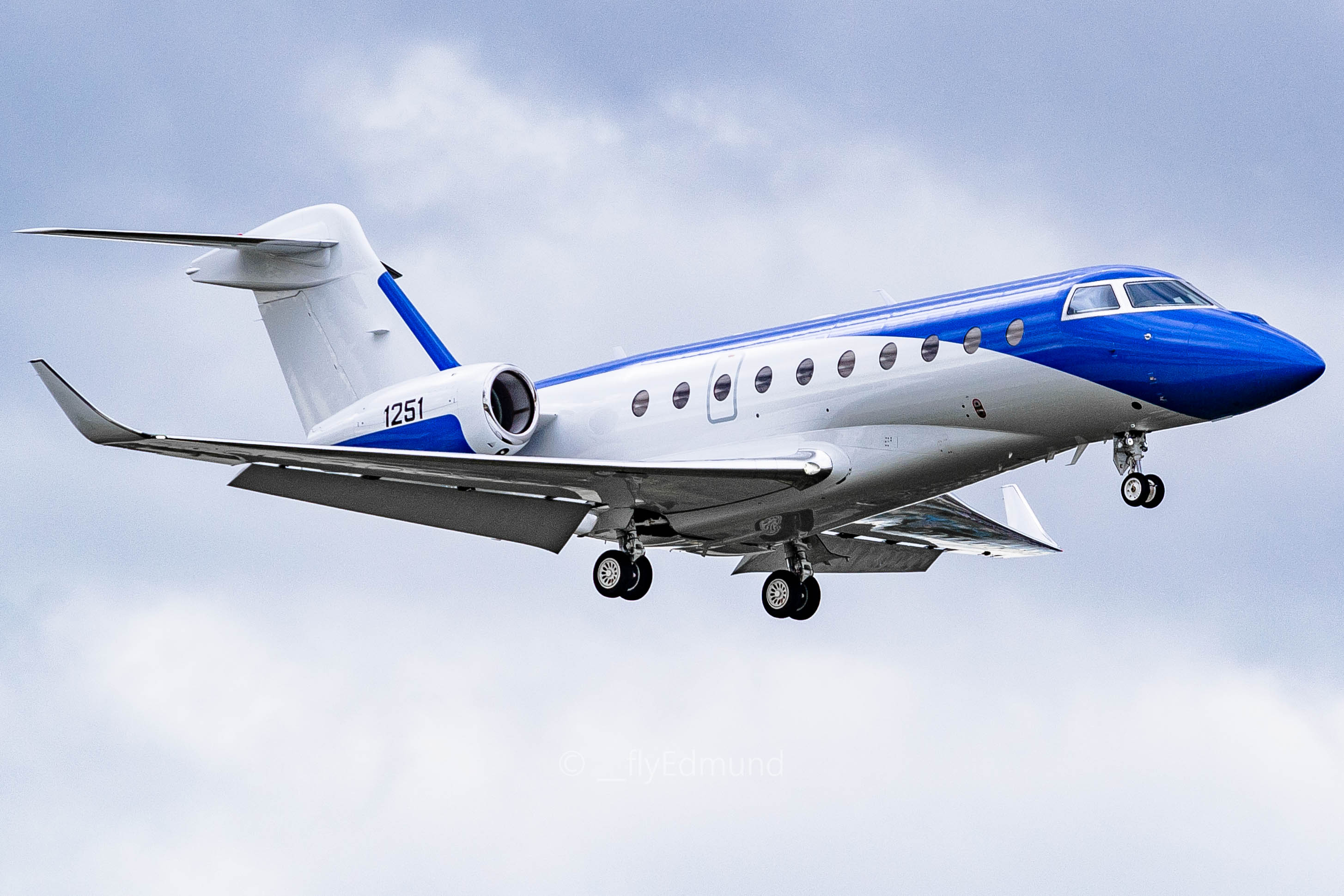
The Presidential Plane

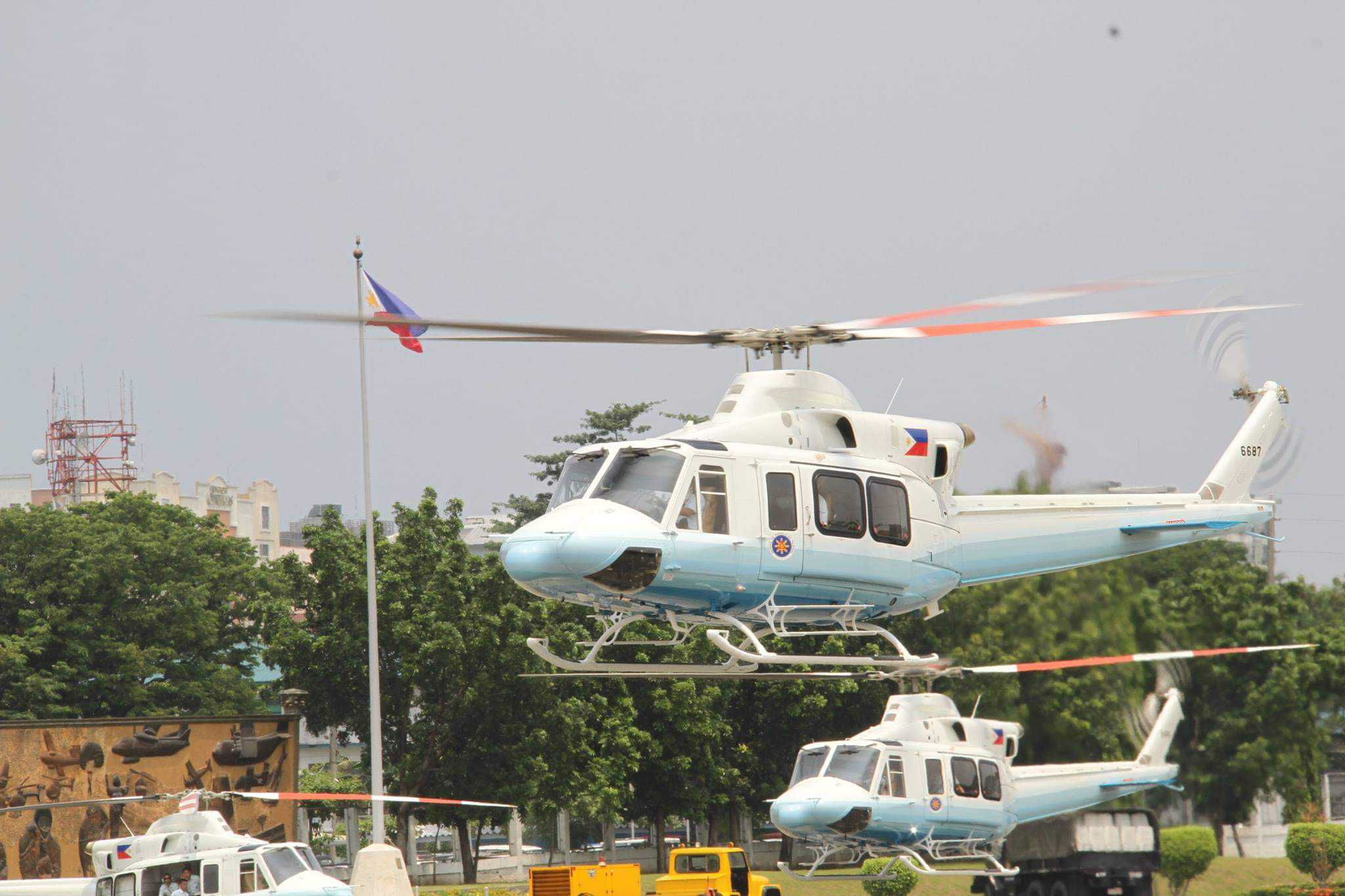
Presidential Helicopter

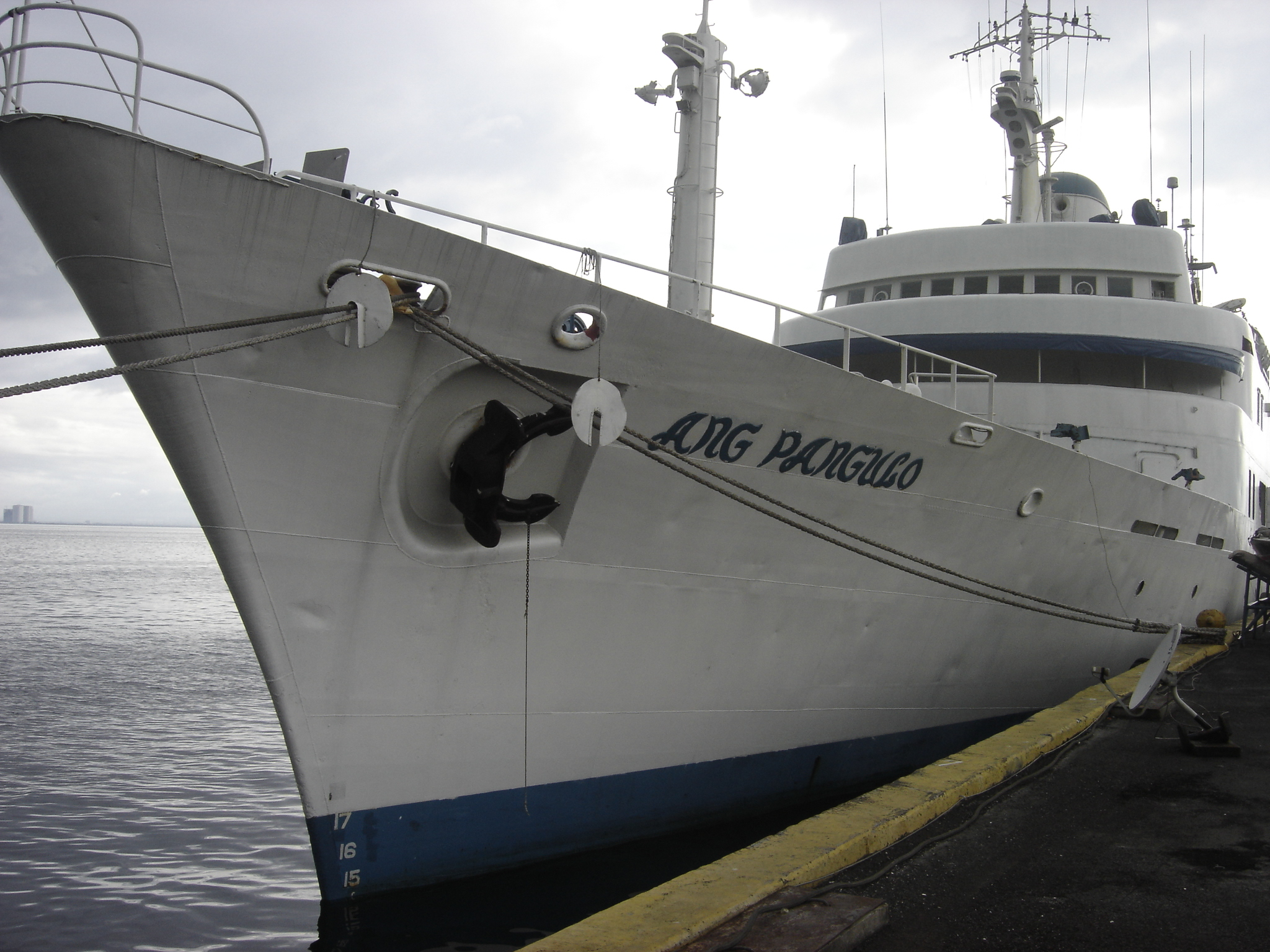
Presidential Yacht

==== Air transportation ====
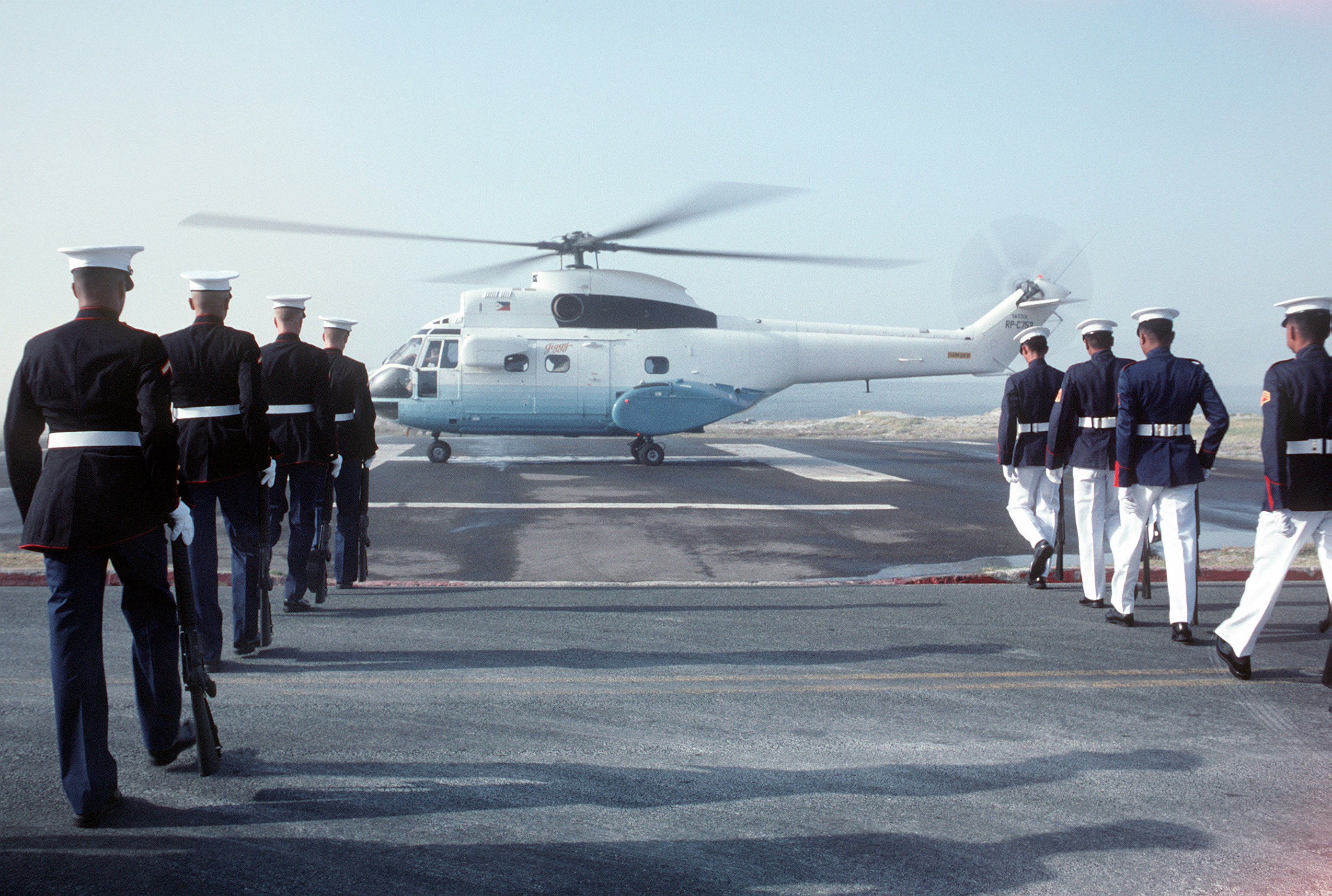
An Aérospatiale SA-330 Puma carrying President Corazon C. Aquino at Subic Bay Naval Base.

The 250th (Presidential) Airlift Wing of the Philippine Air Force has the mandate of providing safe and efficient air transport for the president of the Philippines and the First Family. On occasion, the wing has also been tasked to provide transportation for other members of government, visiting heads of state, and other state guests.

The majority of the fleet is fairly dated with a few exceptions it includes: 1 Fokker F28, which is primarily used for the president's domestic trips and it is also called "Kalayaan One" when the president is on board, 4 Bell 412 helicopters, 3 Sikorsky S-76 helicopters, 1 Sikorsky S-70-5 Black Hawk, a number of Bell UH-1N Twin Hueys, as well as Fokker F-27 Friendships. In September 2020, a new Gulfstream G280 was delivered which will be used for VIP transport as well as for C2 (Command and Control) missions. For trips outside of the Philippines, the Air Force employs a Bombardier Global Express, Gulftsream G650ER or charters appropriate aircraft from the country's flag carrier, Philippine Airlines. Any PAL aircraft with the flight number "PR/PAL 001" and callsign "PHILIPPINE 001" is a flight operated by Philippine Airlines to transport the president of the Philippines. The president sometimes charter private jets for domestic trips within the Philippines due to some airports in the Philippines having small runways.

==== Water transportation ====
BRP Ang Pangulo (BRP stands for Barkó ng Repúblika ng Pilipinas, "Ship of the Republic of the Philippines"; "Ang Pangulo" is Filipino for "the president") was commissioned by the Philippine Navy on March 7, 1959. It was built in and by Japan during the administration of President García as part of Japanese reparations to the Philippines for World War II. It is primarily used in entertaining guests of the incumbent president.

==== Land transportation ====
The president of the Philippines uses two black and heavily armored Mercedes-Benz W221 S600 Guard, whereas one is a decoy vehicle. In convoys, the president is escorted by the Presidential Security Group using primarily Nissan Patrol SUVs with the combination of the following vehicles: Toyota Fortuner, Toyota Land Cruiser, Toyota Hiace, Toyota Innova, Toyota FJ Cruiser Toyota Camry, Philippine National Police 400cc motorcycles, Philippine National Police Mitsubishi Montero, Toyota Innova (Police car variant), other government-owned vehicles, and ambulances at the tail of the convoy; the number depends on the destination. The presidential cars are designated and registered a plate number of "1" or the word "PANGULO" (president). The limousine bears the flag of the Philippines and, occasionally, the presidential standard.

Official state cars of the president
President	Land Transport
Emilio Aguinaldo	1924 Packard Six Touring
Manuel Quezon	1937 Chrysler Airflow Custom Imperial CW
Jose P. Laurel	1942 Packard Custom Super Eight:One-Eighty Limousine
Manuel Roxas	1940 Cadillac Series 75 limousine
Elpidio Quirino	1953 Chrysler Imperial Limousine
Ramon Magsaysay	1955 Cadillac Series 75-23
Carlos P. Garcia	No records, possibly same as Magsaysay
Diosdado Macapagal	1957 Ford Sedan
Ferdinand Marcos	1980 Lincoln Continental Mark VI Signature Series; 1981 Mercedes-Benz 600 Pullman Limousine (W100)
Corazon Aquino	Mercedes-Benz 500SEL (W126)
Fidel V. Ramos	Mercedes-Benz 500SEL Guard (W126)
Joseph Estrada	Mercedes-Benz S600 (W140)
Gloria Macapagal Arroyo	BMW 750iL High Security (E38); Mercedes-Benz S600 (W140); Mercedes-Benz S600 Guard (W220); Mercedes-Benz S600 (W221)
Benigno Aquino III	Mercedes-Benz S600 (W221); Toyota Land Cruiser; Lexus LX570
Rodrigo Duterte	Toyota Land Cruiser; Isuzu D-Max; Toyota Hilux; Chevrolet Colorado
Bongbong Marcos	Toyota Land Cruiser; Cadillac Escalade ESV; Mercedes-Benz S600 (W221); Mercedes-Benz Maybach S680 (W223); Lincoln Continental Coach Door Edition

The Office of the President has also owned various cars over the decades, including a 1937 Chrysler Airflow that served as the country's very first presidential limousine for Manuel L. Quezon. For regional trips, the president boards a Toyota Coaster or Mitsubishi Fuso Rosa or other vehicles owned by government-owned and controlled corporations or government agencies. In this case, the PSG escorts the president using local police cars with an ambulance at the tail of the convoy. Former president Benigno Aquino III, preferred to use his personal vehicle, a Toyota Land Cruiser 200 or his relative's Lexus LX 570 over the black presidential limousines after their electronic mechanisms were damaged by floodwater. Malacañang had announced its interest to acquire a new presidential limousine. His successor, Rodrigo Duterte, utilized a white, bullet-proof armored Toyota Landcruiser as his official presidential vehicle.

=== Security ===
The Presidential Security Command (abbreviated PSC), is the lead agency tasked with providing security for the president, vice president, and their immediate families. They also provide protective service for visiting heads of state and diplomats.

Unlike similar groups around the world who protect other political figures, the PSG is not required to handle presidential candidates. However, former presidents and their immediate families are entitled to a small security detail from the PSG. Currently, the PSG uses Toyota Fortuner SUVs as its primary security vehicles.

== Post-presidency ==
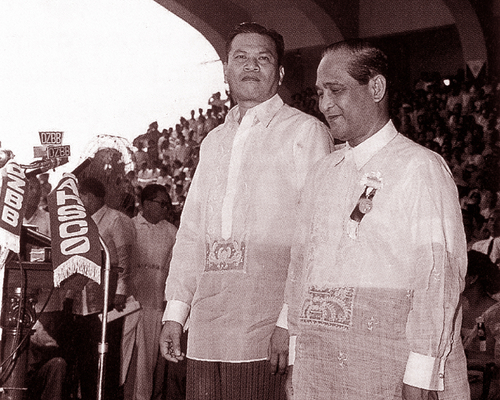
Garcia (right) and Magsaysay (left)

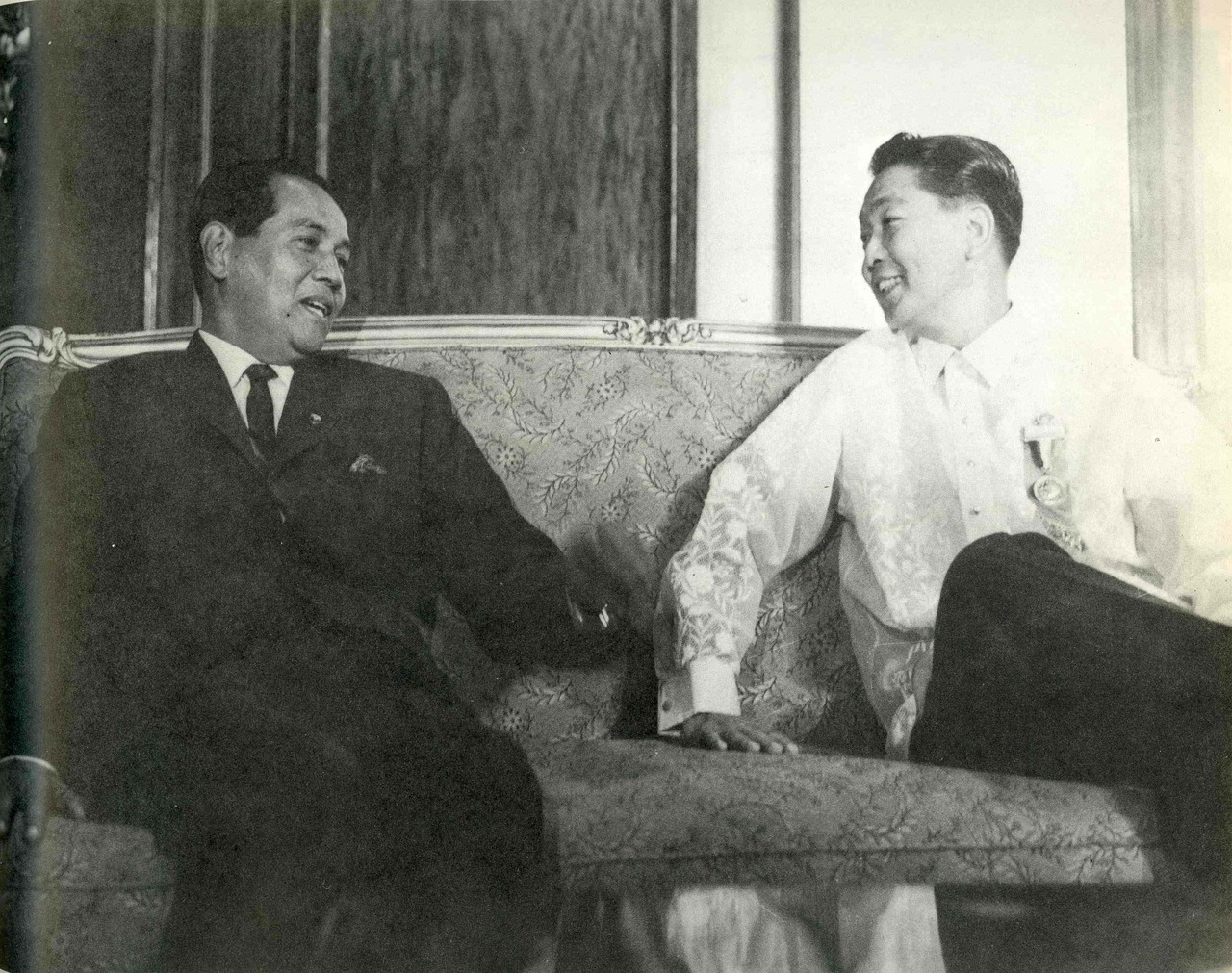
President-elect Ferdinand E. Marcos is received by incumbent President Diosdado Macapagal at the Malacañang Palace Music Room, before both proceeded to the inaugural venue, December 30, 1965.

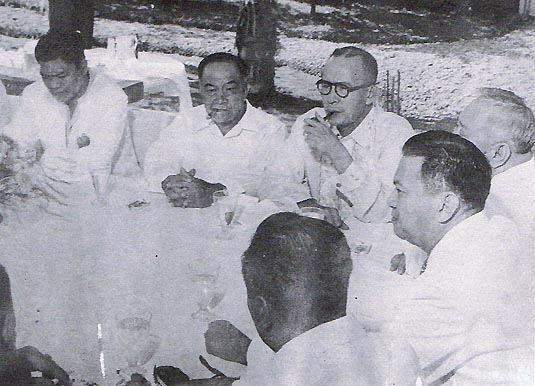
At Malacañang Palace, 1955. Clockwise, from top left: Senator Edmundo Cea, Former President Jose P. Laurel Sr., Senator Cipriano Primicias, Senate President Eulogio A. Rodriguez Sr., President Ramon F. Magsaysay, & House Speaker Jose B. Laurel Jr.

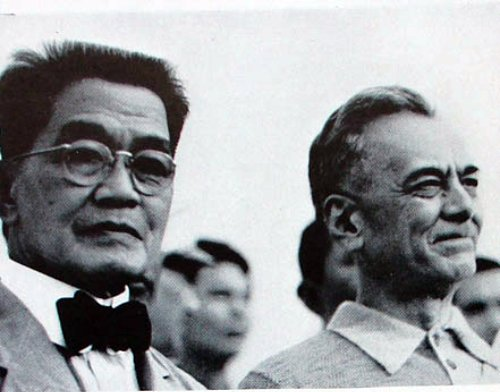
Presidents Emilio Aguinaldo and Manuel L. Quezon during the 1935 campaign.

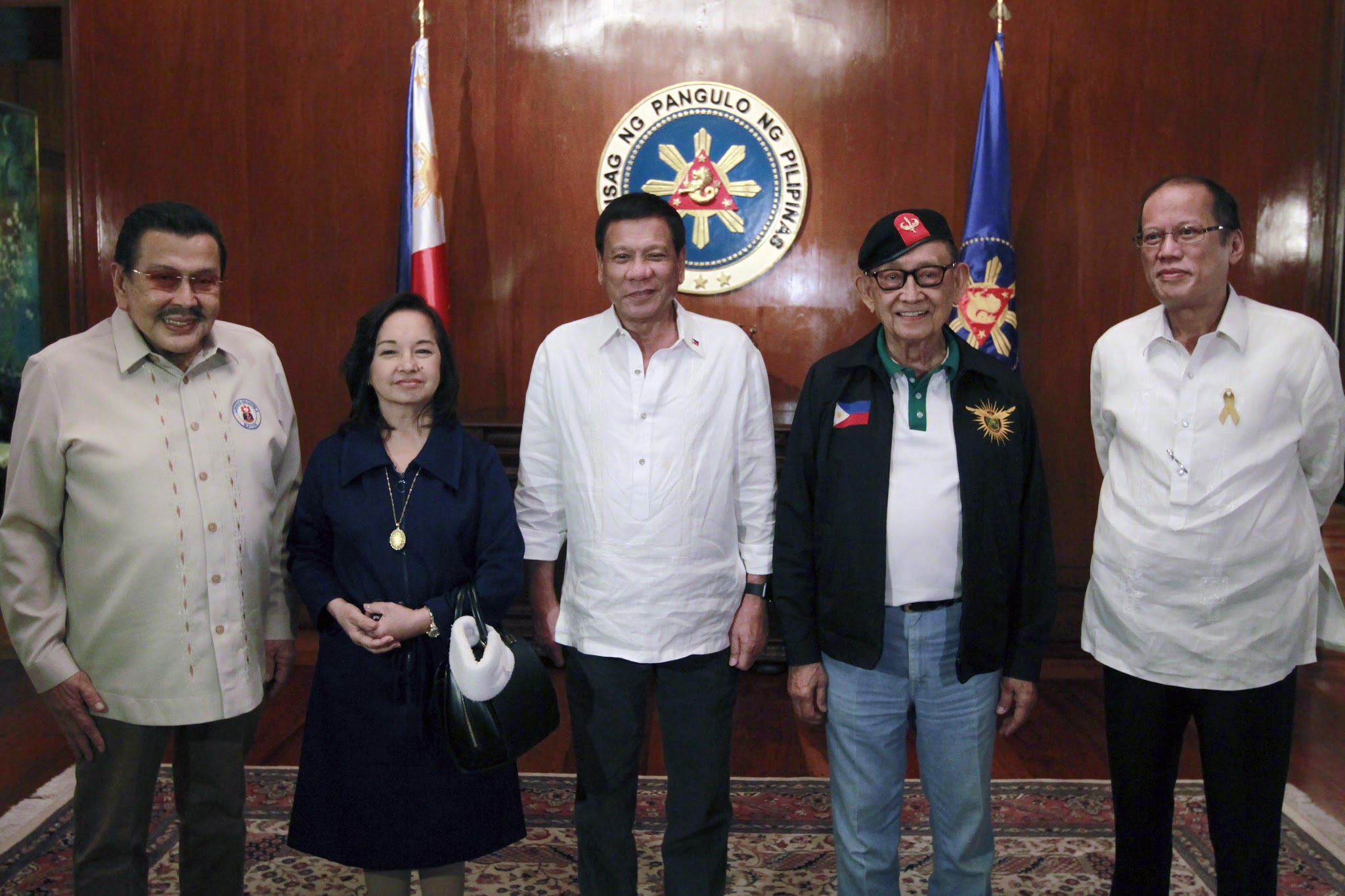
From left: Presidents Joseph Ejercito Estrada, Gloria Macapagal Arroyo, Rodrigo Duterte, Fidel V. Ramos, and Benigno S. Aquino III; photo taken before the start of a National Security Council meeting at the Malacañang Palace on July 27, 2016.

After leaving office, a number of presidents held various public positions and made an effort to remain in the limelight. Among other honors, except Ferdinand Marcos, former presidents and their immediate families are entitled to seven soldiers as their security detail.

- Emilio Aguinaldo established the Association of Veterans of the Revolution and ran for the presidency of the Commonwealth, but lost to Manuel Quezon. After international recognition of Philippine independence, he became a councilor of state under President Quirino.
- José P. Laurel, who was the only president of the Second Philippine Republic, was elected to the Senate in 1951 and would serve in the upper house until 1957, making him the country's first head of state to seek lower office following his presidency. During his tenure, the Nacionalista Party urged him to run for president in 1953. He declined, working instead for the successful election of Ramon Magsaysay, who subsequently appointed Laurel to head a diplomatic mission that was tasked with negotiating trade and other issues with United States officials, resulting in the Laurel-Langley Agreement. Laurel was also the chairperson of the Economic Mission to the United States (1954) and the founder of Lyceum of the Philippines University.
- Sergio Osmeña became a member of the Council of State under Roxas, Quirino, Magsaysay, and García. He was also a member of the National Security Council in the García administration.
- Elpidio Quirino became a councilor of state under President Magsaysay.
- Carlos P. Garcia was a delegate, later elected, president of the Constitutional Convention on June 1, 1971.
- Diosdado Macapagal was also a delegate and then succeeded Carlos P. García as president of the 1971 Constitutional Convention. He also lectured in universities and was later a Councilor of State under presidents Aquino and Ramos.
- Corazon Aquino was a member of the National Security Council under Ramos, Estrada and Arroyo. She was also a member of the Council of State under President Arroyo.
- Fidel Ramos founded the Ramos Peace and Development Foundation. He was a senior advisor and member of the National Security Council under President Estrada. Ramos was a member of the Council of State and an Ambassador-at-Large under President Arroyo. He was later appointed as special envoy to China under President Duterte to open bilateral negotiations with China over the disputes in the South China Sea but later resigned on November 1 following President Duterte's state visit to Beijing on October 16, 2016.
- Joseph Estrada returned to film in November 2009, starring in Ang Tanging Pamilya: A Marry Go Round as part of a promotional attempt to run for a second term as president in 2010 amid controversy on the legality of his intent (he was allowed to run anyway by the COMELEC since the Supreme Court never weighed in on the matter) with many questioning why such a constitutional violation was ever allowed. His release from prison in 2007 by his successor, Gloria Macapagal Arroyo, restored his political privileges and allowed him to run again. Estrada eventually became a member of the National Security Council under Arroyo, Aquino III, Duterte and Marcos Jr. Following his loss to Aquino III in 2010, he ran against Alfredo Lim for the office of Mayor of Manila in 2013, and won. Estrada was mayor from 2013 to 2019, thus making him the third head of state to run for lower office following his presidency.
- Gloria Macapagal Arroyo ran for and won a seat in the House of Representatives of the Philippines as the Representative for the 2nd District of Pampanga in the 2010 elections and in the 2022 elections, making her the second head of state after Laurel to seek lower office following her presidency. Arroyo would later serve in major positions in the House of Representatives such as Deputy Speaker within two consecutive terms (from 2016 to 2017, and another currently in 2022) and was later elected as House Speaker on July 23, 2018, making her the first woman to hold that position.
- Benigno Aquino III became a councilor of state under President Duterte.
- Rodrigo Duterte was a member of the National Security Council under Marcos Jr.

== See also ==
- First ladies and gentlemen of the Philippines
- Spouse of the president of the Philippines
- Prime Minister of the Philippines
- Seal of the president of the Philippines
- Languages spoken by presidents of the Philippines
- List of unofficial presidents of the Philippines
- Vice President of the Philippines
  - List of vice presidents of the Philippines
- Filipino styles and honorifics
- Heads of state and government of the Philippines
- List of people pardoned or granted clemency by the president of the Philippines
- List of sovereign state leaders in the Philippines
- List of recorded datu in the Philippines
- Governor-General of the Philippines
- Principalía
- Malacañang Palace
- "We Say Mabuhay"
