= We Say Mabuhay =

Philippine patriotic song

We say Mabuhay!
- Personal anthem of the President of the Philippines
- Lyrics: James King Steele
- Music: Tirso Cruz Sr, 1931
- Published: 1931

Audio sample
- Audio sample of "We say Mabuhay!": file; help

"We Say Mabuhay" (sometimes called the "Mabuhay March") is the common name for "Mabuhay, My Philippines", a march used as the honors music for the president of the Philippines. It was composed by Tirso Cruz, with lyrics by James King Steele.

== History ==
Tirso Cruz penned the melody to "We Say Mabuhay", with lyrics by James King Steele, sometime during the 1930s. Various dates have been attributed to the original composition of "We Say Mabuhay" ranging from 1931 to 1940. According to The Philippine Star, however, it was first performed May 16, 1931 at the Manila Hotel.

During World War II, U.S. government broadcasters used the melody of the song for their radio program The Philippine Hour, which was transmitted from relay stations in Australia and San Francisco to the Japanese-occupied archipelago. The lyrics and music to the song were also printed in a 1945 issue of the U.S. Army propaganda leaflet Free Philippines, which was covertly distributed in the country. In that version of the song, the original lyrics "under our blue sky" were substituted with "under the blue sky", a version that has remained as the one most commonly used in the Philippines since.

As the honors music for the President of the Philippines, "We Say Mabuhay" is traditionally performed at the Philippine presidential inauguration following the oath of office of the incoming president, as well as at other times during the entrance or approach of a sitting President of the Philippines. In keeping with the American custom, it is traditionally preceded by four ruffles and flourishes by a military band, but in parades the formation on the parade ground just stands at attention and everyone stands as the song is played.

The word "Mabuhay", which forms part of the song's title and features prominently in its lyrics, is a Tagalog greeting meaning "long live".

"We Say Mabuhay" (sample)

Lyrics:

We say Mabuhay!
We say Mabuhay!
Under the blue skies,
Where our friends sit by!

A greeting of farewell!
A toast that will wear well!
We raise our voices and say Mabuhay!

== Composer and lyricist ==
Tirso Cruz was a prominent Filipino bandmaster in the 1930s and 1940s who helped popularize jazz in the Philippines. He is remembered for his longtime leadership of the Mabuhay Orchestra, the house band at the Manila Hotel.

James King Steele was an American public relations executive who, during the 1930s, was retained to promote tourism to the Philippines and would later fill a similar role for Nevadans Unlimited, a tourism trade group in the United States state of Nevada.

== See also ==
- "Hail to the Chief"
