= Zuleika T. Lopez =

Filipino government official and lawyer (born 1974)

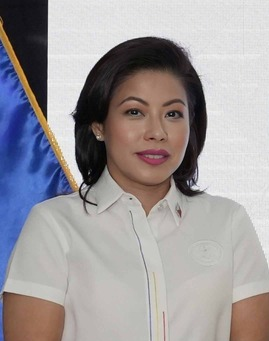
- Lopez in 2023

Chief of Staff to the Vice President of the Philippines
- Incumbent
- Assumed office July 26, 2022
- Vice President: Sara Duterte
- Preceded by: Philip Dy

Davao City Administrator
- In office July 31, 2016 – June 30, 2022
- Mayor: Sara Duterte
- Preceded by: Jesus Melchor Quitain
- Succeeded by: Francis Mark Layog
- In office July 6, 2010 – August 4, 2010
- Mayor: Sara Duterte
- Preceded by: Wendel Avisado
- Succeeded by: Zuleika T. Lopez (acting)

Davao City Administrator Acting
- In office August 4, 2010 – June 30, 2013
- Mayor: Sara Duterte
- Preceded by: Zuleika T. Lopez
- Succeeded by: Jhopee Avanceña-Agustin

Personal details
- Born: June 12, 1974 (age 51) Davao City, Philippines

Zuleika Tanglao Lopez (born June 12, 1974), also known by the initials ZTL, is a Filipino lawyer and government official currently serving as the Chief of Staff at the Office of the Vice President of the Philippines (OVP) under Sara Duterte. She previously served as city administrator of Davao City during Duterte's mayorship and as city council secretary during Duterte's vice mayorship. She also served as a graft investigator at the Office of the Ombudsman in Mindanao prior to entering Davao City government.

In late November 2024, Lopez was briefly detained at the Batasang Pambansa Complex after being cited in contempt by a house committee for attempting to prevent the Commission on Audit from providing the committee with audit reports on the OVP's confidential expenses. During her detainment, Lopez initiated a midnight press conference through Zoom that featured Duterte's admission of communicating with a contract killer to target president Bongbong Marcos if Duterte is assassinated.

== Early life ==
Zuleika Lopez was born to jurist and lawyer Jose B. Lopez (1943–2012), a member of the Bagobo tribe.

== Career ==
Lopez was among the first employees to be hired at the University of the Philippines Mindanao after its establishment in 1995, where she was information officer. She also worked at the Office of the Ombudsman in Mindanao (OMB-MIN) as graft investigator and prosecution officer up to 2007.

=== Davao City staff member (2007–2013; 2016–2022) ===
In 2007, Lopez was hired as the Davao City Council secretary under the vice mayorship of Sara Duterte. When Duterte was elected mayor in 2010, Lopez was soon considered for the position of city administrator due to her satisfying Duterte's requirement that the role be filled by a lawyer and not a politician; she was subsequently appointed as city administrator on July 6, 2010. Her office as a government official was noted to conspicuously sport the color pink in its design.

Less than a month into her appointment as city administrator, Lopez's position was scrutinized by the city council led by then-vice mayor Rodrigo Duterte, Sara's father, who argued that she did not qualify to be administrator as she had yet to serve the minimum five years in an administrative or managerial position as required by the Local Government Code prior to her appointment. In response, Mayor Sara Duterte withdrew her request for the council's concurrence in appointing Lopez, stating that her office will first "gather all the documents to support the qualifications of Attorney Lopez" and relegating Lopez to an acting capacity instead. Duterte also released various statements threatening to halt engagements between city hall and the city council based on the latter's actions, stating that the council "should learn to respect" her office as mayor, and shared in a radio interview that the Civil Service Commission (CSC) had already expressed its approval of Lopez prior to her appointment.

By August 7, 2010, Lopez took an indefinite leave as acting city administrator, with assistant city administrator Erwin Alparaque taking over the position temporarily. By November, Lopez had returned as city administrator in an acting capacity, a position she held until Duterte's first mayoral term ended in 2013.

Upon Duterte's election to a second term in 2016, Lopez was once again appointed city administrator, which she held until 2022.

With a position traditionally considered as the "little mayor", Lopez had sizable authority in Duterte's mayoral office as city administrator, with her being credited in the implementation of Duterte's agenda and the handling of problems within every department at city hall. She also enforced a "Do Not Bring Work at Home" policy to avoid overworking among the city staff.

=== Chief of Staff to the Vice President (2022–present) ===
After Sara Duterte was elected Vice President of the Philippines in 2022, Lopez represented Duterte in the transition meeting with outgoing Vice President Leni Robredo in early June. Soon after assuming office, Duterte decided to appoint four of her previous Davao City staff members, including Lopez, to her team at the Office of the Vice President (OVP); Lopez's appointment as the OVP Chief of Staff was announced through Duterte's Facebook page on July 26, 2022.

In September 2023, Lopez assisted Duterte in defending her use of confidential and intelligence funds (CIF) during the plenary deliberations for the 2024 national budget.

In a September 2024 hearing by the House Committee on Good Government and Public Accountability as chaired by Rep. Joel Chua, former undersecretary Gloria J. Mercado of the Department of Education (DepEd) alleged that Lopez was responsible in instructing her to resign in late October 2023 based on Secretary Duterte's request for Mercado's immediate resignation, despite Lopez having no assigned position at DepEd herself. On November 3, 2024, Chua asked the Department of Justice (DOJ) to issue an immigration lookout bulletin order (ILBO) against Lopez and six other OVP officials for continuously snubbing his committee's hearings regarding the OVP's alleged misuse of funds. However, by the evening of November 4, Lopez was able to leave the Philippines by boarding a plane at the Ninoy Aquino International Airport (NAIA) headed to Los Angeles, California to visit her ailing aunt. On the following day, she along with six other OVP staff released a position paper that asks the committee to terminate its inquiry into their office's fund use, claiming that its hearings are "not in aid of legislation" and "violative of the rights of resource persons."

In late November 2023, Lopez was briefly detained at the Batasang Pambansa Complex after being cited in contempt by the House Committee on Good Government and Public Accountability for sending a letter requesting the Commission on Audit to not provide the committee with audit reports on the OVP's confidential expenses. During her detainment, Lopez initiated a midnight press conference through Zoom that featured Duterte's admission of communicating with a contract killer to target president Bongbong Marcos if Duterte is assassinated; Duterte had been preventing her transfer by House authorities to the Correctional Institution for Women at the time. Immediately after the conference, Lopez was sent to the Veterans Memorial Medical Center after suffering a panic attack, where she spent the remainder of her detainment.

In December 2024, Lopez went on indefinite leave as OVP Chief of Staff, having previously expressed to Duterte during detainment her intention to resign. By February 3, 2025, Lopez was seen back at the OVP attending the office's flag-raising ceremony.

== Personal life ==
In April 2017, Lopez underwent surgery to remove gallstones found in her gallbladder, which she attributed to processed foods she had been eating while maintaining her tight work schedule.
