= Office of the Vice President of the Philippines =

Government agency in the Philippines

- Tanggapan ng Pangalawang Pangulo ng Pilipinas
- Seal of the Office of the Vice President

Agency overview
- Formed: November 15, 1935; 90 years ago
- Jurisdiction: Government of the Philippines
- Headquarters: 11th Floor Cybergate Plaza, EDSA cor. Pioneer Street, Mandaluyong, Metro Manila
- Agency executives: Usec. Zuleika Lopez, Chief of Staff to the Vice President; Atty. Salvador Paolo A. Panelo, Spokesperson
- Website: ovp.gov.ph

The Office of the Vice President (OVP; Filipino: Tanggapan ng Pangalawang Pangulo) is an administrative, advisory, consultative government agency which aids the vice president of the Philippines in performing their duty as the second-highest executive official of the government of the Philippines.

== History ==
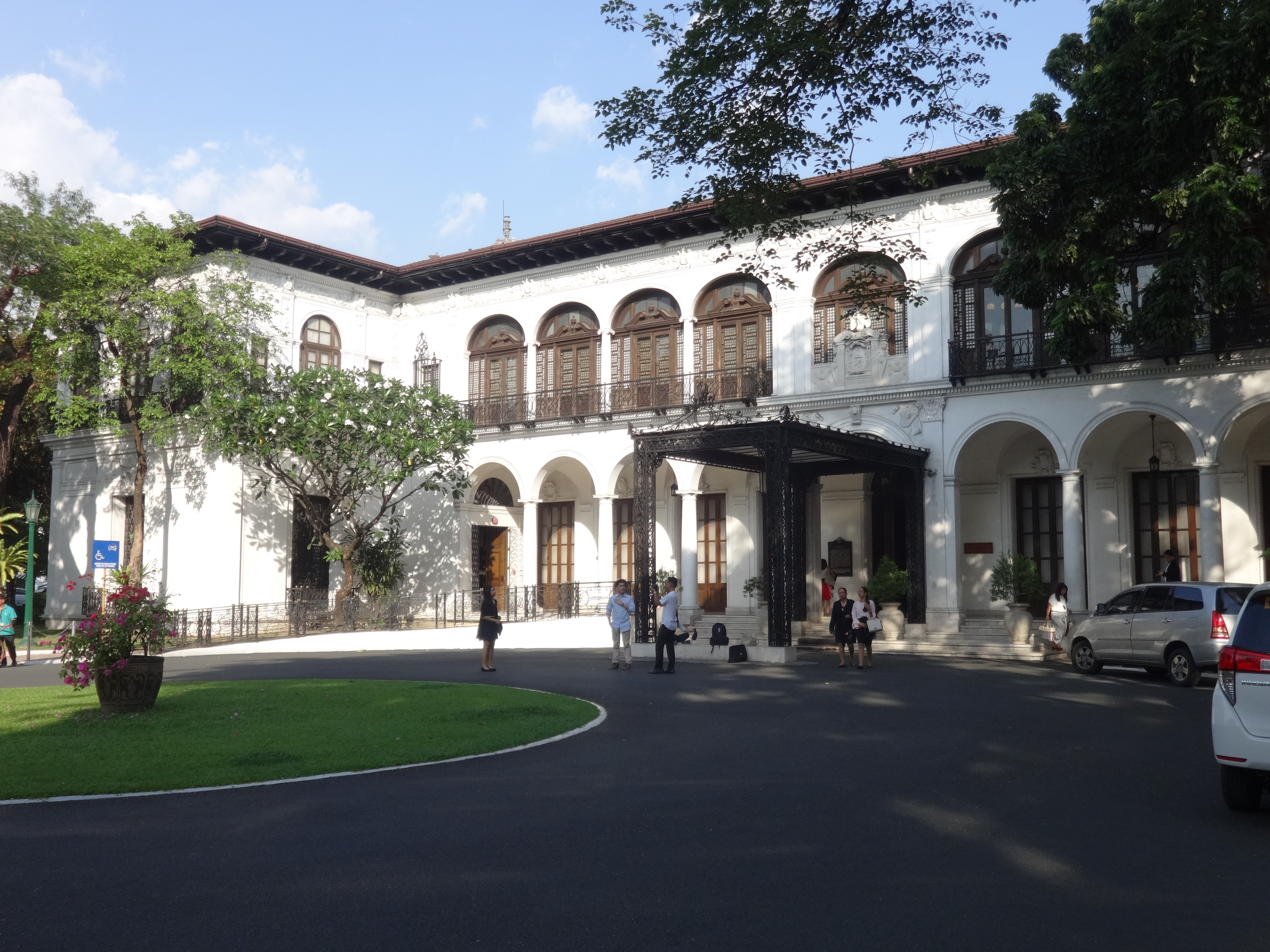
The Kalayaan Hall of Malacañang Palace, formerly known as the Executive Building, served as the office of the vice president of the Philippines from 1935 until 1972.

During the Commonwealth period until its dissolution after the imposition of martial law in 1972, the Office of the Vice President was hosted within the Malacañang Palace complex inside the Executive Building (now Kalayaan Hall).

When the office was re-established in 1987 with Salvador Laurel as vice president, the OVP took office at the Legislative Building (which now hosts the National Museum of Fine Arts) in the former prime minister's office.

The OVP moved out of the building when the National Museum organization took over the building. The vice president's office then took office at the Philippine International Convention Center (PICC) and the PNB Financial Center, both in Pasay. During Vice President Jejomar Binay's tenure, the OVP was hosted at the Coconut Palace. During Vice President Leni Robredo's tenure and the first month of her successor Sara Duterte's term, the OVP was hosted at the Quezon City Reception House. The present office is hosted at Robinsons Cybergate Plaza in Mandaluyong. By July 2022, the OVP established satellite offices for the first time in its history.

Under Duterte's tenure, the OVP has been characterized by its compartmentalized structure, with Duterte directly interacting with the office's various divisions instead of having the chief of staff function as an intermediary. From 2022 to 2023, Duterte directly coordinated with special disbursing officer Gina F. Acosta in the handling of the office's confidential and intelligence funds (CIF), who would then disburse them to Col. Raymund Dante P. Lachica, chief of the Vice Presidential Security and Protection Group (VPSPG), for further disbursement. In December 2025, a security officer named Ramil Madriaga filed an affidavit alleging that as the person who had formed the VPSPG upon Duterte's request, he served under Cols. Lachica and Dennis Nolasco in the delivery of confidential funds to several point persons, among whom were an aide to a mayor from Laguna and the owner of a Quezon City comedy bar. Aside from the confidential funds, he also claimed that he has personally been engaging in this type of operation for Duterte even prior to her becoming vice president in 2022.

== Current staff ==
- Chief of Staff to the Vice President: Zuleika Lopez
  - Assistant Chief of Staff to the Vice President: Lemuel Ortonio
- Spokesperson: Atty. Salvador Paolo A. Panelo
- Director for Administrative and Financial Services: Rosalynne Sanchez
- Director for Strategy Management: Sunshine Charry Fajarda
- Director for Operations: Norman Baloro
- Chief of Public Assistance Division: Winnie Dayego

== Timeline ==
Office used	Vice President	Years
Executive Building, Malacañan Palace	Sergio Osmeña	1935–1944
Executive Building, Malacañan Palace	Elpidio Quirino	1946–1948
Executive Building, Malacañan Palace	Fernando Lopez	1949–1953
Executive Building, Malacañan Palace	Carlos P. Garcia	1953–1957
Executive Building, Malacañan Palace	Diosdado Macapagal	1957–1961
Executive Building, Malacañan Palace	Emmanuel Pelaez	1961–1965
Executive Building, Malacañan Palace	Fernando Lopez	1965–1972
None (Note: Fernando Lopez was unable to finish his term following the declaration of martial law in 1972, which was supposed to end in 1973, and the vice presidency was abolished that same year upon the ratification of the 1973 Constitution.)		1972–1984
Vacant (Note: No election was called following the 1984 amendment to the 1973 Constitution that restored the vice presidency, until the election of Salvador Laurel in 1986.)		1984–1986
Legislative Building, Manila	Salvador Laurel	1986–1992
Philippine International Convention Center, Pasay	Joseph Estrada	1992–1998
Philippine International Convention Center, Pasay	Gloria Macapagal Arroyo	1998–2001
Philippine International Convention Center, Pasay	Teofisto Guingona Jr.	2001–2004
PNB Financial Center, Pasay	Noli de Castro	2004–2010
Coconut Palace, Pasay	Jejomar Binay	2010–2016
Quezon City Reception House, Quezon City	Leni Robredo	2016–2022
Robinsons Cybergate Plaza, Mandaluyong	Sara Duterte	2022–present

== Gallery ==
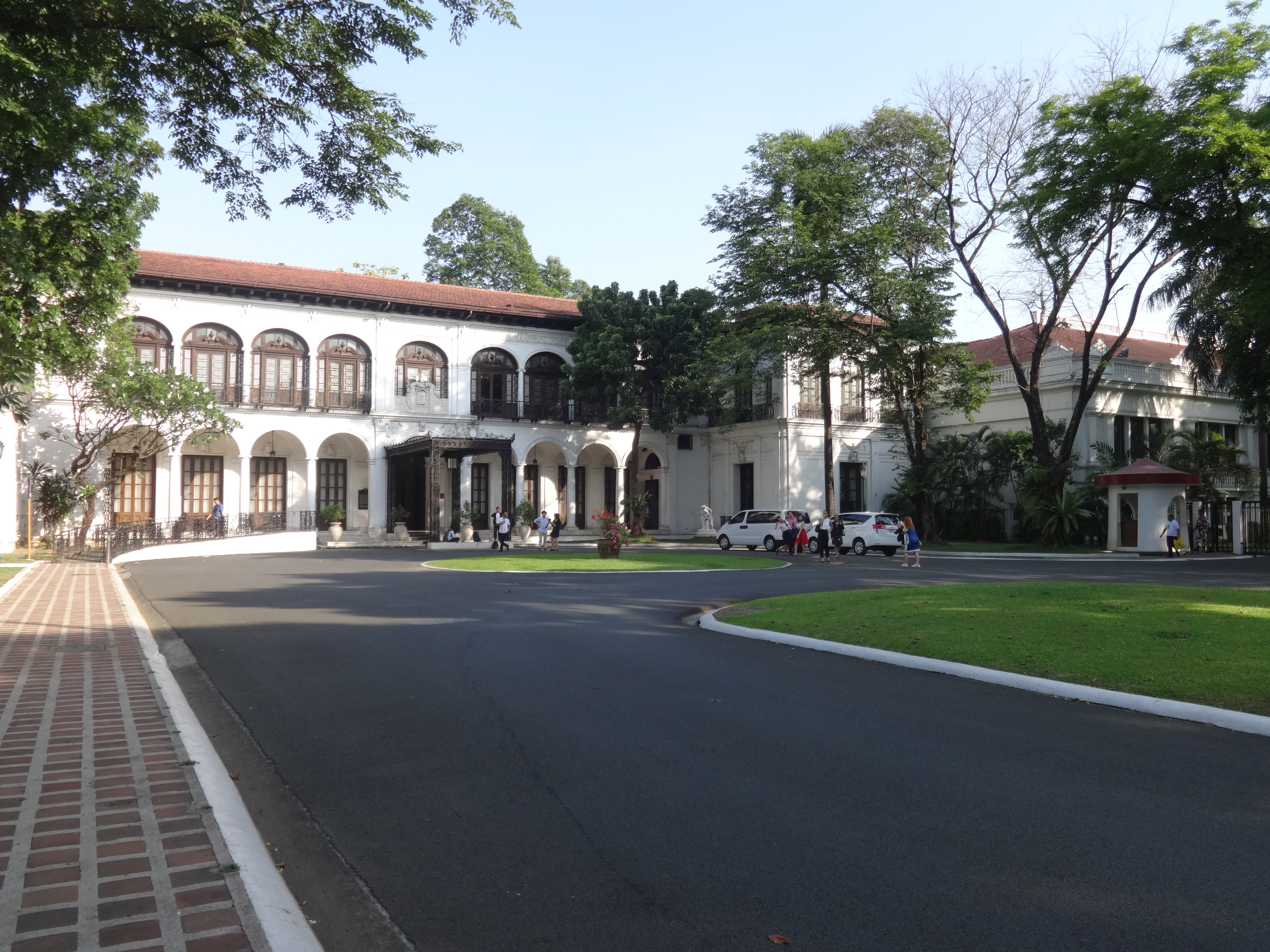
Executive Building, Malacañan Palace (presently the Kalayaan Hall)

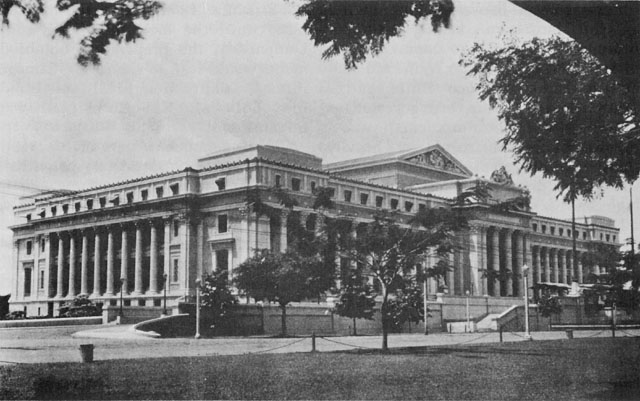
Legislative Building (presently the National Museum of Fine Arts, Manila)

Philippine International Convention Center, Pasay

PNB Financial Center, Pasay

Coconut Palace, Pasay

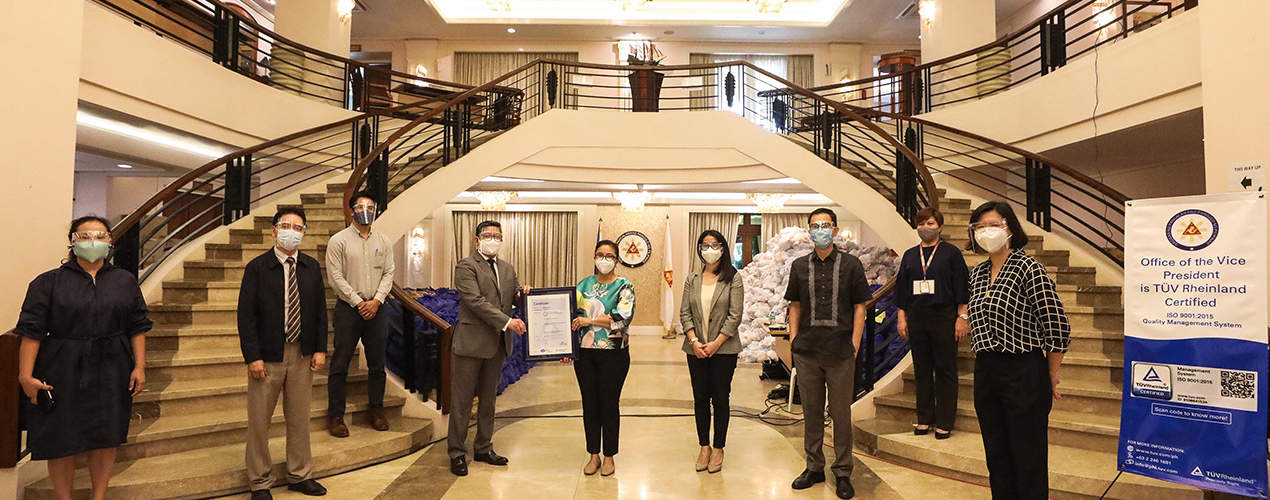
Interior of the Quezon City Reception House, as seen during the OVP's receipt of its ISO 9001:2015 recertification under Vice President Leni Robredo

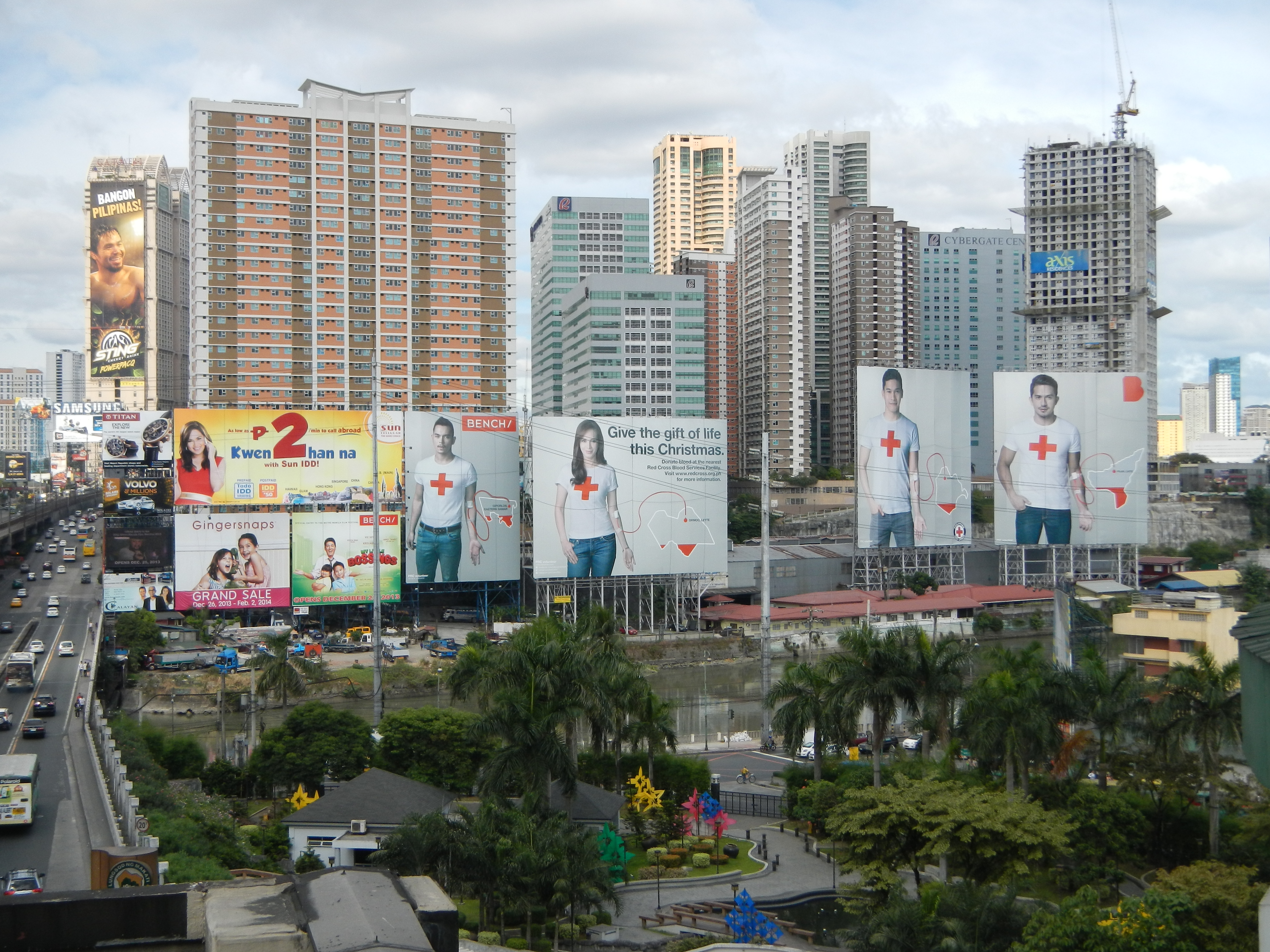
Robinsons Cybergate, Mandaluyong as seen from Guadalupe, Makati, hosting the current headquarters of the Office of the Vice President

== See also ==
- List of vice presidents of the Philippines
- Office of the President of the Philippines
- Chief of Staff to the Vice President of the Philippines
