= Chief of Staff to the Vice President of the Philippines =

Administrative position in the Filipino government

Chief of Staff of the Office of the Vice President
- Punong Tauhan sa Pangalawang Pangulo ng Pilipinas
- Seal of the Office of the Vice President

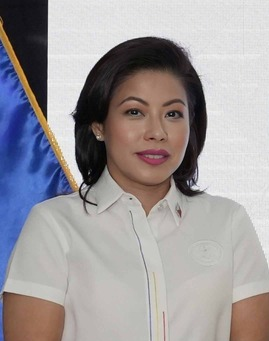
- Incumbent; Zuleika Lopez since 2022
- Office of the Vice President
- Type: Chief of staff
- Seat: 11th Floor Cybergate Plaza, EDSA cor. Pioneer Street, Mandaluyong, Metro Manila
- Appointer: Vice President of the Philippines
- Deputy: Assistant Chief of Staff to the Vice President
- Website: https://www.ovp.gov.ph/

The chief of staff to the vice president of the Philippines is a chief of staff administrative position within the Office of the Vice President of the Philippines. The chief of staff is responsible for assisting the vice president and the office itself in its operations, programs, and initiatives.

== Known chiefs of staff ==
Portrait	Chief	In office	Vice President
	Ma. Lourdes Herrera	1986–1992	Salvador Laurel
	Renato Corona	1998–2001	Gloria Macapagal Arroyo
	Stella Marie Guingona	2001 – June 30, 2004	Teofisto Guingona Jr.
	Jesse Andres	June 30, 2004 – June 30, 2010	Noli de Castro
	Benjamin Martinez Jr.	June 30, 2010 – June 30, 2016	Jejomar Binay
	Philip Dy	June 30, 2016 – June 30, 2022	Leni Robredo
	Zuleika Lopez	June 30, 2022 – present	Sara Duterte

== Controversies ==
In 2024, Zuleika Lopez, the chief of staff of vice president Sara Duterte, faced public scrutiny and was subpoenaed by the House of Representatives. The inquiry was focused on the use of confidential and intelligence funds allocated to the OVP, which were questioned for their transparency and accountability. Lopez's role in overseeing these funds and her testimony before the legislative body brought attention to the financial operations of the OVP.

== In popular culture ==
- Thou Reyes portrays Chief of Staff Yessey Reyes to Vice President Glenn Acosta on the GMA Network series First Yaya.
