= San Pedro College =

Roman Catholic college in Davao City, Philippines

- Former names: San Pedro Hospital School of Nursing (1956–1973)
- Motto: Amor Servit (Love Serves)
- Type: Private Roman Catholic Non-profit Coeducational Basic and Higher education institution
- Established: 1956; 70 years ago
- Founder: Dominican Sisters of the Trinity
- Religious affiliation: Roman Catholic (Dominican)
- Academic affiliations: PAASCU ASEACCU CEAP DACS COCOPEA
- Chairperson: Sr. Araceli B. Dela Cruz, OP
- President: Sr. Aida T. Frencillo, OP
- Vice-president: Dr. Desiderio N. Noveno, Jr., DM (Executive VP); Sr. Indalyn D. Kuizon, OP (VP for Finance)
- Principal: Sr. Josefa E. Dumapias, O.P. (Basic Education Department), Mrs. Allene L. Sayas-Tan, LPT, MEDLT (Senior High School)
- Dean: Dr. Marleonie M. Bauyot, PhD (Graduate School)
- Patron Saints: St. Peter the Apostle, St. Dominic de Guzmán, and St. Therese of the Child Jesus
- Faculty: 600
- Administrative staff: 350
- Students: 2500 (Grade School); 1500 (High School)
- Undergraduates: 7000 (College)
- Postgraduates: 100 (Graduate School)
- Location: 12 C. Guzman Street, Obrero, Davao City (Main Campus), Davao-Bukidnon Highway, Ulas, Davao City (Basic Education Campus), Davao del Sur, Philippines; 7°04′41″N 125°36′57″E
- Campus: Urban Main Campus Guzman St., Davao City (Senior High, Undergraduate, Graduate Schools) Satellite Campus Ulas, Davao City (Grade School & Junior High School)
- Medium of instruction: English and Tagalog (for Filipino subjects and other subjects that mainly use Filipino)
- Newspaper: The Rock (Main Campus); The Veritas (Basic Education Campus)
- Colors: Blue and White
- Nickname: SPC
- Sporting affiliations: DACS DCL DBL
- Mascot: Stallion
- Website: www.spcdavao.edu.ph
- Location in Mindanao Location in the Philippines

San Pedro College is a private, Catholic, research, coeducational basic and higher education institution run by the Dominican Sisters of the Trinity in Davao City, Davao del Sur, Philippines. It was founded in 1956.

It began as a school of nursing of the San Pedro Hospital, the first Catholic hospital in Mindanao, which the religious sisters have been operating since their arrival in 1948. Now, it encompasses several allied health sciences, arts and sciences, education and business programs, in addition to the nursing course it first offered.

The college is broadly organized into seven undergraduate departments and one graduate division at its main (Guzman Street) campus, with each college and the graduate division defining its own admission standards and academic programs in near autonomy. The college also administers one satellite Basic Education Department campus at Ulas, Davao City. Of its fifteen undergraduate colleges, eight offer degrees in the health sciences. These are the departments of Nursing, Pharmacy, Psychology, Physical Therapy, Respiratory Therapy, Radiologic Technology, Medical Technology, and most recently, Public health. SPC's graduate school offers two doctorate programs, one master in nursing program, and five master of arts programs.

Since its founding, San Pedro College has been a coed, Catholic institution where admission has not been restricted by gender, race, or religion (despite being a Catholic institution). The student body consists of nearly 7,000 undergraduate and 100 graduate students from all over the country, but majority comes from Mindanao particularly Davao City, where the school is located. Basic Education enrollees total to around 4,000.

In 2012, San Pedro College opened its Basic Education Campus at Ulas, Davao City, for school year 2012-2013.

In August 2016, San Pedro College adopted the North American academic calendar, with the school year beginning in mid-August and the second semester starting on a late January or early February. Academic years are expected to end at June.

== Programs offered ==
=== Nursing ===
SPC's Nursing Department ranked 4th according to the Professional Regulation Commission based on the January 2016 Licensure Exams.

=== Respiratory Therapy ===
SPC's Respiratory Therapy program ranked first in the September 2014 and 2015 RT board exams, and As of September 2016 occupies second place in the Philippines.

=== Medical Technology (Medical Laboratory Science and Public Health) ===
In the September 2014, September 2015, and August 2016 Medical Technology Licensure examinations, SPC's Medical Technology program ranked 9th, 5th, and 6th respectively.

=== Pharmacy ===
The school was ranked first in the June 2016 Pharmacist Licensure Examinations by the Professional Regulation Commission. SPC's Department of Pharmacy has been ranked as one of the Top 5 Pharmacy Programs in the Philippines in the past few years, garnering the 4th spot twice in the July 2015 and January 2016 Pharmacy Licensure Examinations, and the second spot in the January 2014 exam.

=== Radiologic Technology ===
The school is offering BS Radiologic Technology starting S.Y. 2018 - 2019.

== Ulas Campus ==
In 2012, San Pedro College opened its Basic Education Department Campus at Ulas, Davao City, for school year 2012-2013, accepting its first applicants for Pre-School, Grades 1 to 4, and 1st to 2nd Year High School, with its first principal, Sr. Bambina P. Lapara, O.P. At present, the Ulas Campus now offers Pre-School, Kindergarten 1-2, Elementary Grades 1-6, Junior High School Grades 7-10, and Senior High School Grades 11-12. SPC also offers Senior High School admissions at the Main Campus. Its present principal is Sr. Josefa E. Dumapias, O.P.

== Notable alumni ==
- Sara Duterte-Carpio - politician, 15th Vice President of the Philippines, 38th Secretary of Education, former Mayor of Davao City (B.Sc. Respiratory Therapy, '19). In her inaugural speech as mayor of Davao City, Duterte said she originally wanted to be a pediatrician instead of a politician. She later took up a law degree from San Beda College but transferred to the San Sebastian College – Recoletos, where she graduated in May 2005. In 2005, Duterte passed the Philippine Bar Examination. She then worked for a few months as a court attorney at the office of Supreme Court Associate Justice Romeo Callejo Sr.
- Ruwel Peter Gonzaga - lawyer and politician, former representative, 2nd district of Davao de Oro
