= Sara Duterte =

Vice President of the Philippines since 2022

- Official portrait, 2022

15th Vice President of the Philippines
- Incumbent
- Assumed office June 30, 2022
- President: Bongbong Marcos
- Preceded by: Leni Robredo

53rd Secretary of Education
- In office June 30, 2022 – July 19, 2024
- President: Bongbong Marcos
- Preceded by: Leonor Briones
- Succeeded by: Sonny Angara

21st Mayor of Davao City
- In office June 30, 2016 – June 30, 2022
- Vice Mayor: Paolo Duterte (2016–18); Bernard Al-ag (acting; 2018–19); Sebastian Duterte (2019–22)
- Preceded by: Rodrigo Duterte
- Succeeded by: Sebastian Duterte
- In office June 30, 2010 – June 30, 2013
- Vice Mayor: Rodrigo Duterte
- Preceded by: Rodrigo Duterte
- Succeeded by: Rodrigo Duterte

10th Vice Mayor of Davao City
- In office June 30, 2007 – June 30, 2010
- Mayor: Rodrigo Duterte
- Preceded by: Luis Bonguyan
- Succeeded by: Rodrigo Duterte
Other roles and positions
Co-Vice Chair of the National Task Force to End Local Communist Armed Conflict
In office May 10, 2023 – July 19, 2024 Serving with Eduardo Año
President	Bongbong Marcos
Preceded by	Position established
Succeeded by	Vacant
President of the Southeast Asian Ministers of Education Organization
In office February 8, 2023 – July 19, 2024
Vice President	Romaizah Salleh
Preceded by	Chan Chun Sing
Succeeded by	Sonny Angara
Party positions held
Chairperson of Lakas–CMD
In office November 17, 2021 – May 19, 2023
President	Martin Romualdez
Preceded by	Bong Revilla
Succeeded by	Bong Revilla
Chairperson of Hugpong ng Pagbabago
Incumbent
Assumed office February 23, 2018
President	Claude Bautista
Preceded by	Position established

Personal details
- Born: Sara Zimmerman Duterte; May 31, 1978 (age 48) Davao City, Philippines
- Party: HNP (since 2018)
- Other political affiliations: Lakas (2021–2023); HTL (2011–2018); PDP–Laban (2007–2011)
- Spouse: Mans Carpio (m. 2007)
- Relations: Duterte family
- Children: 4
- Parents: Rodrigo Duterte; Elizabeth Zimmerman
- Education: San Pedro College (BS); San Beda College; San Sebastian College – Recoletos (LL.B.)
- Occupation: Politician; lawyer
- Website: Office of the Vice President

Military service
- Allegiance: Philippines
- Branch/service: Philippine Army
- Years of service: 2009–present (PAR)
- Rank: Colonel
- Sara Duterte's voice Duterte speaks on the impeachment complaint endorsed by Akbayan. Recorded February 7, 2026

Sara Zimmerman Duterte-Carpio (Note: English: /dəˈtɜːrteɪ/, Filipino: [ˈsaː.ɾɐʔ dʊˈtɛɾtɛ]) (born May 31, 1978), commonly known as Inday Sara, (Note: Inday is a Cebuano term meaning "young girl", often used as a term of endearment.) is a Filipino lawyer and politician who is the 15th and current vice president of the Philippines. She is the third female vice president (after Gloria Macapagal Arroyo and Leni Robredo), the third vice president to come from Mindanao, and the youngest ever Philippine vice president. A daughter of the 16th president Rodrigo Duterte. She previously served as the mayor of Davao City from 2010 to 2013, and from 2016 to 2022. She was also Davao City's vice mayor from 2007 to 2010.

Duterte graduated from San Pedro College, initially aiming to pursue a medical career. She attended classes in the College of Law of San Beda College and eventually graduated in San Sebastian College – Recoletos. She was elected as Davao City's vice mayor in 2007, before eventually serving as the city's mayor from 2010 until 2013, succeeding her father and becoming the youngest and the first female mayor of the city. After her first term ended, she took a brief hiatus, returning to politics in 2016 after being elected again as Davao City mayor and was reelected in 2019. During her second stint as mayor, she initiated the Byaheng DO30 and Peace 911 programs in the city, as well as overseeing the city government's COVID-19 pandemic response. Duterte was also an influential figure in national politics during her father's presidency, forming alliances with several political parties and playing a key role in the ouster of Pantaleon Alvarez as the Speaker of the House of Representatives in 2018.

Duterte ran for the vice presidency in 2022 under Lakas–CMD, becoming the running mate of Bongbong Marcos from the Partido Federal ng Pilipinas under the UniTeam alliance. Their ticket won in a landslide victory, becoming the first running mate pair to win together since 2004, and the first to be elected by a majority since the establishment of the Fifth Republic in 1986. Duterte became the vice president on June 30, 2022, having her inauguration held 11 days earlier in Davao City.

As vice president, Duterte concurrently served as the secretary of education amidst a national learning crisis and as vice chairperson of an anti-insurgency task force (NTF-ELCAC), but resigned from both positions on June 19, 2024. Despite her initial electoral alliance with Marcos, political observers noted her increasing absence from public appearances with the president in 2024 correlating with a growing rift in the Marcos and Duterte political families. By late August 2024, during police operations to arrest her father's ally Apollo Quiboloy, she openly admitted her regret to supporting Marcos in the presidential election, while Marcos himself later acknowledged that they have not spoken to each other since she handed in her resignation. After her father was arrested and brought to The Hague in March 2025, her tenure has been characterized by multiple trips abroad that aim to consolidate her family's overseas supporters.

On February 5, 2025, Duterte was impeached by the House of Representatives after concerns were raised regarding her use of confidential funds and her assassination threat against President Marcos, his wife Liza, and his cousin, House Speaker Martin Romualdez. She became the first sitting vice president, as well as the fifth official in Philippine history, to be impeached, and by May 2026, became the first Philippine official to be impeached twice. However, Duterte remains in office as a Senate trial is ongoing since July 2026 to determine if she should be acquitted or removed from her position as vice president. On February 18, 2026, she announced her 2028 run for president.

== Early years ==
Sara Zimmerman Duterte was born at Davao Doctors Hospital in Davao City on May 31, 1978. She is the second child to then-lawyer later president Rodrigo Duterte and flight attendant Elizabeth Zimmerman. Her maternal great-grandfather was German American, having fled to the Philippines from the United States.

After his philandering father, Rodrigo Duterte, cheated on her mother leading to their annulment, Sara Duterte had a "love-hate relationship" with her father when she was a student due to her disapproval for his womanizing tendencies and late night habits. On the evening of February 25, 1986, at age seven, she and her siblings were brought by Rodrigo to the San Pedro Cathedral to join in celebrations of the ouster of President Ferdinand Marcos by the People Power Revolution, in which her grandmother Soledad took part, with Sara remembering her father to have said: "Timan-i ninyo ning gabhiona ni. Ayaw ninyo kalimti" (lit. 'Remember this night. Do not forget it'). In 1994, her brother Paolo left the family without explanation to raise his first son (Omar Vincent) with Lovelie Sangkola for the next five years. Once Rodrigo left his wife Elizabeth in the 1990s, Sara stayed with her mother, and up to the time she was mayor, Sara considered her relationship with her father as "not very close". Despite this, Rodrigo considered Sara to be his favorite child, and placed high value on the education she and her brothers received.

=== Education and law career ===
Duterte attended San Pedro College, majoring in BS Respiratory Therapy, and graduated in 1999; in her inaugural speech as mayor of Davao City, Duterte said she originally wanted to be a pediatrician instead of a politician. She later took up a law degree from San Beda College but transferred to the San Sebastian College – Recoletos, where she graduated in May 2005. In 2005, Duterte passed the Philippine Bar examination, with a score of 80 percent. She then worked for a few months as a court attorney at the office of Supreme Court Associate Justice Romeo Callejo Sr.

=== Fake Jewish ethnicity ===
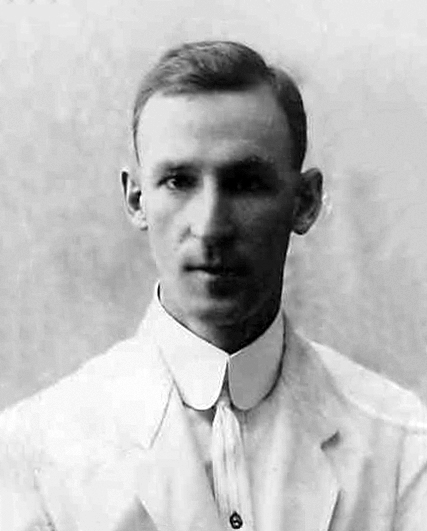
Duterte's maternal great-grandfather, George John Zimmerman, who is not Jewish.

On September 30, 2016, Rodrigo Duterte sparked outrage after stating that "Hitler massacred three million Jews... there's three million drug addicts. I'd be happy to slaughter them." Rodrigo Duterte claimed on October 3, 2016, during Rosh Hashanah, that the Zimmerman family is of patrilineal Jewish descent, with Elizabeth Zimmerman's father supposedly having fled to the Philippines from Nazi Germany. In the speech, Duterte said "[..] my wife is a Zimmerman. She is a descendant of an American Jew. [..] So why would I defile the memory of the Jews? What would I get if I insult the Jewish people [..]"

Contrary to popular belief and many Philippine and Israeli media reports repeating Rodrigo Duterte's claims, the Zimmermans are not Jewish. In a statement released on June 27, 2023, six years after both of Rodrigo's remarks were made, then-Press Secretary Trixie Cruz-Angeles reiterated that the claims that the Zimmermans were Jewish are false, saying "[t]he Zimmermans arrived in the PH in the 1930s and were not refugees during World War II. They are not European Jews, but came from the US." On June 28, 2023, historian Todd Sales Lucero (a columnist from The Freeman, a newspaper based in Cebu), reported that Zimmerman's grandfather, George J. Zimmerman, is an American German Lutheran who hails from Unterlangau, Bavaria, who is non-Jewish. While there are German Jews with the name Zimmermann, this does not mean all Zimmermans are Jewish in origin. DNA testing in the Zimmermans has further disproven the claim of Jewish heritage. It is likely that Rodrigo made the claim of Jewish ancestry in order to justify his previous remarks, after the fact.

== Vice mayor of Davao City (2007–2010) ==
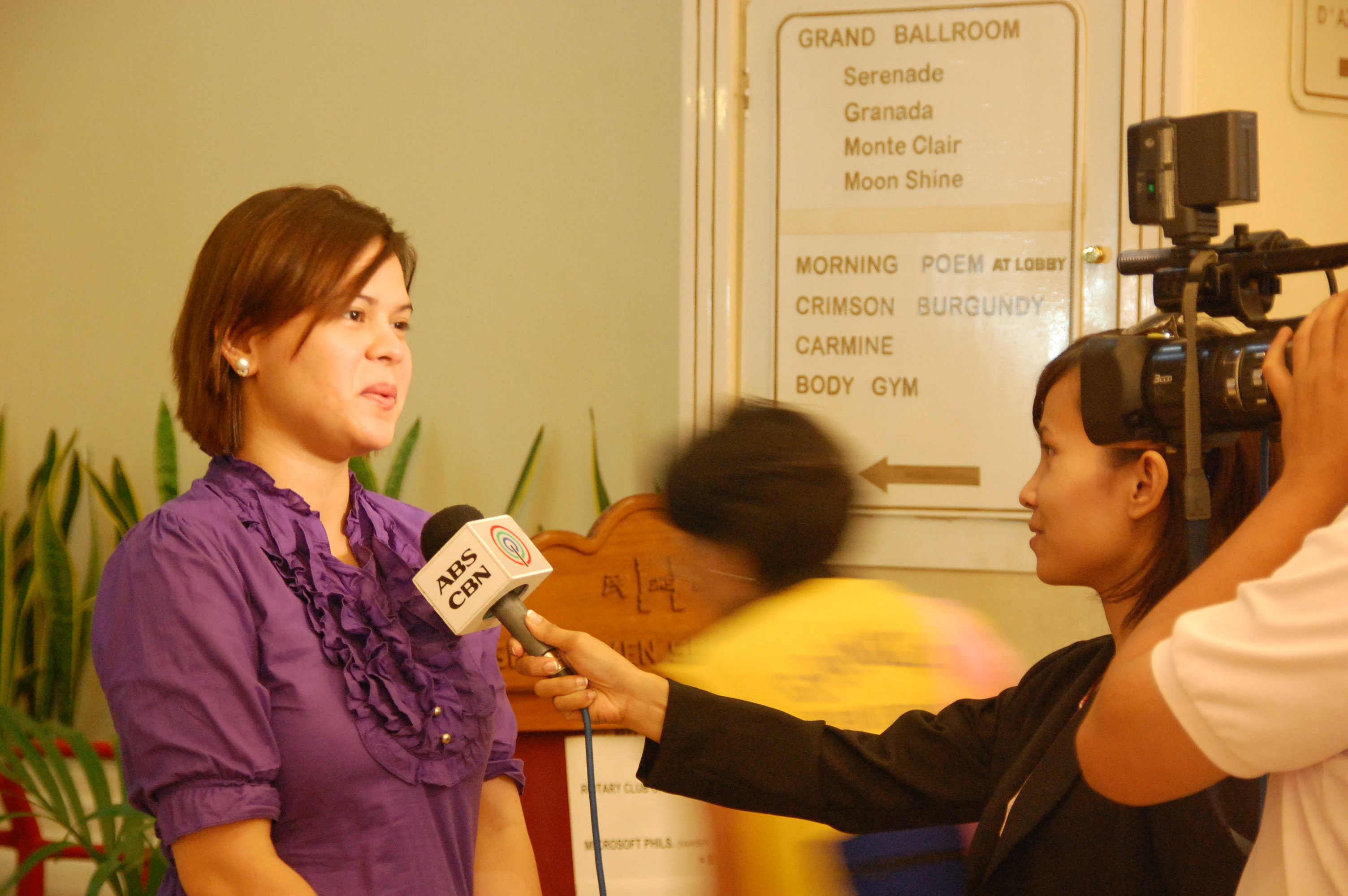
Duterte being interviewed on March 12, 2009, while vice mayor

Sara's father Rodrigo had admitted to initially keeping his family members from entering "the messy and difficult world of politics", but by December 2006, he expressed that he would like for Sara to run as his running mate in the 2007 mayoral elections due to his concern for corrupt politicians taking over and ruining his legacy. Sara Duterte was elected vice mayor in 2007 with over 330,000 votes, defeating lone opponent Jeff Ho and succeeding Luis Bonguyan. Duterte served under her father for one term until 2010, and concurrently served as a regional officer of the National Movement of Young Legislators from 2007 to 2010. It was during this time when lawyer Zuleika T. Lopez was first hired by Duterte to be a staff member of the city government, receiving the position of city council secretary.

As vice mayor, Duterte's landmark project was 'Inday para sa Barangay', a whole-of-government approach servicing yearly in each of the city's barangays. It was later called the Caravan of Government Services when she transferred it to the Office of the City Mayor.

In 2008, Duterte's stated net worth jumped to ₱18.49 million from the previous year's ₱7.25 million (another source provides ₱13.88 million for 2007) based on her filed statements of assets, liabilities, and net worth (SALN), above the net worth declared by her father, Mayor Rodrigo Duterte (₱15.32 million) in 2008.

== First term as mayor of Davao City (2010–2013) ==
In 2010, Duterte was elected mayor, becoming the first female mayor of the city, as well as being the youngest to have been elected, as she turned 32 years old just weeks after being proclaimed winner. She won over House Speaker Prospero Nograles, her father's political rival, in a lead of 200,000 votes in the 2010 elections. Nograles earlier filed a protest at the Commission on Elections in Manila questioning the results, stating that there was a conspiracy of local poll officials. Vowing to be "useful and to serve the country at all times", she assumed the post that her father Rodrigo held for over 20 years. After Duterte appointed Zuleika T. Lopez as city administrator a few days into her term, her decision was challenged by the city council led by Rodrigo, then the vice mayor of Davao, who argued that Lopez was unqualified for the position. In response, Sara withdrew her request for the council's concurrence in Lopez's appointment and threatened to halt city hall's engagements with the city council, stating that the council "should learn to respect" her office as mayor.

During her first term, she also served as officer in the National Executive Board of the League of Cities Philippines from 2010 to 2013.

On December 2, 2010, President Benigno Aquino III appointed her as Chairperson of the Regional Development Council (RDC) Region XI. She was the first woman to hold the position and the first to be appointed from the government sector since the reorganization of the council in 1986. As chairperson, she saw the growth of Davao Region’s Gross Regional Domestic Product from 3.9 percent in 2011 to 7.1 percent in 2012.

On July 1, 2011, Duterte gained national attention when she punched Abe Andres, a Davao City Regional Trial Court sheriff, over the demolition of shanties in Barangay Kapitan Tomas Monteverde Sr., Agdao, Davao City. Earlier, she had asked the court and the demolition team to delay the demolition; Andres declined her request and pushed through with the demolition which infuriated her. On July 11, Sheriffs Confederation of the Philippines Inc. filed a complaint against Duterte in connection to the incident. On June 28, 2012, almost a year after the incident, she publicly apologized to Andres and his family. By May 2022, Andres openly expressed his support for the Marcos-Duterte electoral team.

=== Policies ===
Duterte promoted the city as a tourism and investment destination, introducing the "Davao: Life Is Here" tagline to market the city in 2011.

== Political hiatus (2013–2016) ==
Duterte decided not to seek re-election in 2013 to give way to her father Rodrigo. She also turned down her father's offer to run for representative of Davao City's 1st district.

== Second and third term as mayor of Davao City (2016–2022) ==
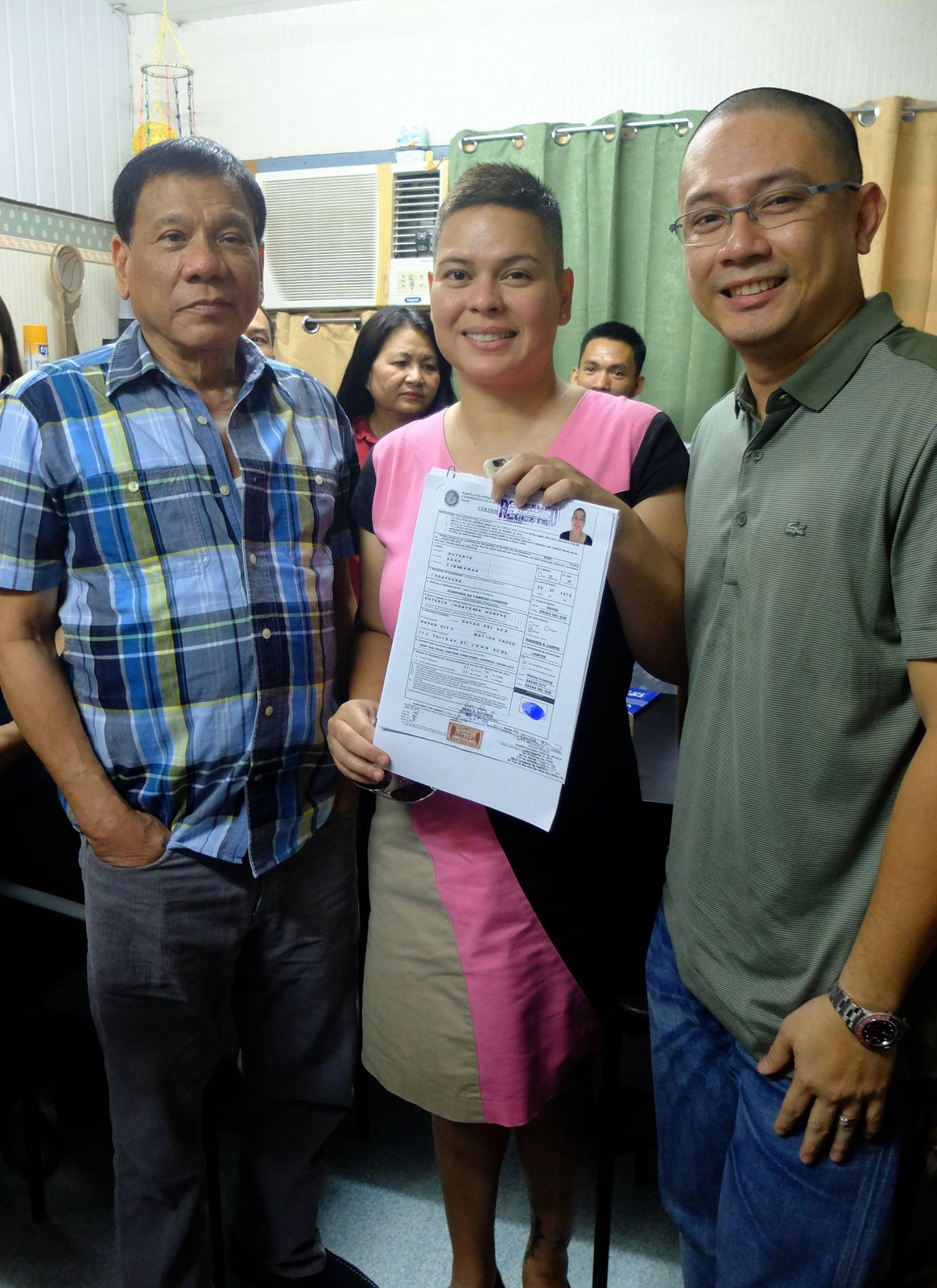
Sara Duterte (center) filing her certificate of candidacy for mayor of Davao City accompanied by his father Mayor Rodrigo Duterte (left) and her husband Mans Carpio (right).

Duterte ran again for the mayoralty post for Davao City in the 2016 elections and won the position, succeeding her father for the second time. She had her older brother Paolo, and later Bernard Al-ag, as her vice mayors during this term. According to lawyer Salvador Panelo, Duterte had been reluctant in running for mayor, wishing to stay away from politics and instead continue her legal practice, but was eventually convinced by her father.

In her first year back as mayor, the Davao City bombing took place on September 2, 2016, with Duterte's private nurse Kristia Bisnon, who accompanied Duterte during hospital checkups in July for her pregnancy with triplets, among the victims who perished. Three days later, Duterte's doctor informed her that she had a miscarriage with two of her three fetuses, which she revealed during a speech on September 8, 2016.

On October 23, 2017, Mayor Duterte launched the Tapang at Malasakit (lit. 'Courage and Compassion') Alliance for the Philippines (TMAP) at the Marquis Events Place in Taguig, composed of Duterte supporters and allies, where she announced her intention to run for the Davao City 1st district seat at the House of Representatives and called on people to "fight global terrorism by quickly rebuilding Marawi, focus on our poverty that has fueled narco-politicians, set aside our personal politics" in support of President Duterte.

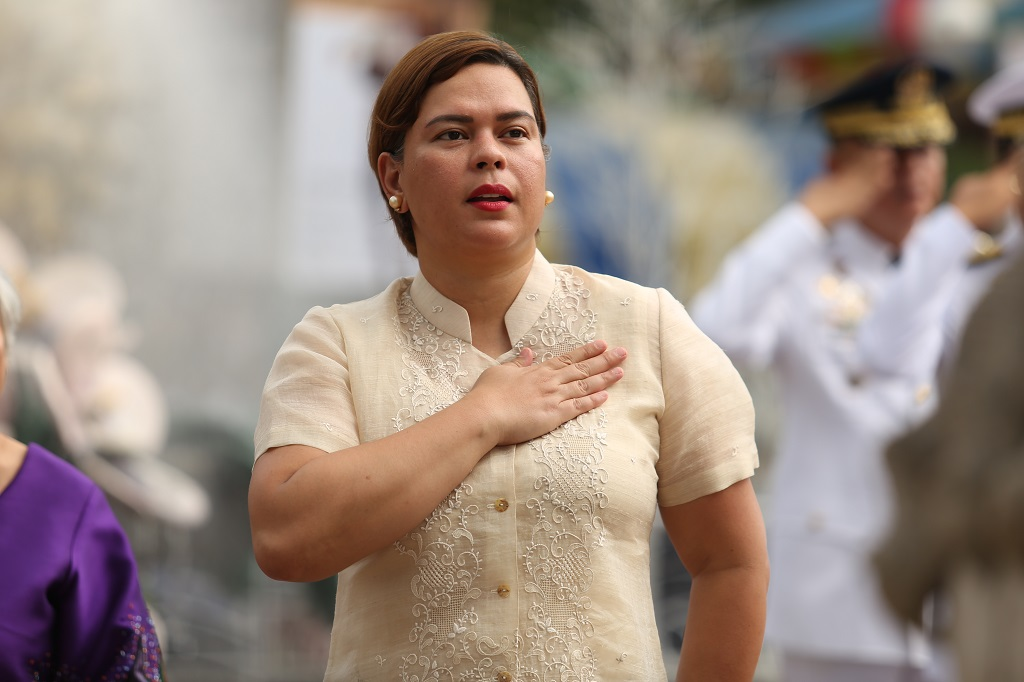
Duterte during Rizal Day 2018

On February 23, 2018, she launched a new regional party called Hugpong ng Pagbabago (HNP). The party was later approved on July 4, 2018, ahead of the 2019 general elections. HNP also stood as an electoral alliance, fielding candidates from different parties for the senatorial election. Nine out of 13 senatorial candidates won in the election.

Following the creation of HNP, a feud began between Duterte and one of her father's allies, then House Speaker Pantaleon Alvarez, citing its formation as an example of the entrenchment of political dynasties in the country. In response, Duterte publicly berated Alvarez and alleged that he has been calling mayors in the Davao Region to tag her as part of the opposition and brag about having the ability to impeach her father, all of which Alvarez denied. Duterte also remarked that "the Philippines will be a better country if he is not Speaker." Months later, Alvarez was unseated as the House Speaker in the 17th Congress, with former president and Pampanga's 2nd district representative Gloria Macapagal Arroyo taking his place. According to her father, she was behind the ousting of Alvarez as speaker, stating that "honest to God, it was Inday who maneuvered it."

Although she previously intended to run for Congress in 2019 after her second term, Mayor Duterte stated in September 2018 that she is willing to serve a third term as mayor, with her brother Paolo (by then resigned from the vice mayorship) to run for the congressional seat instead. In the May 2019 elections, Duterte defeated her lone opponent, a 67-year-old sari-sari store owner named Jun Marcellones, by a lead of over 500,000 votes and succeeded reelection, with her brother and running mate Sebastian also elected vice mayor. After the election, congressman-elect Alan Peter Cayetano advised Duterte against endorsing Marinduque representative Lord Allan Velasco for the speakership due to its potential to "break up the 'group'" and be detrimental to the Dutertes' allies in the 2022 presidential election, which Duterte deemed as a "veiled threat". In 2020, Duterte did not declare any cash deposits or cash on hand for her 2019 statement of assets, liabilities, and net worth (SALN), which she later repeated for the succeeding five years.

=== Policies ===
During her second stint as mayor, Duterte initiated Byaheng DO30, consisting of 30 projects addressing ten priority sectors which include "education, health, poverty alleviation, infrastructure development, solid waste management and environment, agriculture, investment and tourism, traffic and transport management, disaster risk reduction and management, and peace and order". Duterte also established the Peace 911 program to address the local communist rebellion through a "human-centered" approach, bringing several government services to far-flung areas. The program was first implemented in the Paquibato district before being expanded to other barangays. Her administration also established the Kean Gabriel Hotline for reporting child abuse anonymously.

As Davao City mayor, Duterte garnered an approval rating of 93% according to an independent survey by the RP-Mission and Development Foundation, exceeding her father's highest approval rating when he was mayor at 86% in 2010, and getting the highest rating throughout the country.

=== COVID-19 pandemic response ===
In early 2020, the COVID-19 pandemic reached the city. In response, Duterte created a city task force for COVID-19 and other public health emergencies and instituted several measures to limit the spread of the disease and address the crisis. The city government cancelled several citywide events, ordered the closure of several establishments, and restricted travel and movement in the city. To aid residents affected by the restrictions, the local government provided food packs; most of the city's Bayanihan grant was spent on the purchase of food packs distributed to the city's barangays and for medical workers. Travel restrictions were eased as the number of cases lowered. The local government also established COVID-19 testing centers and isolation facilities. Her administration also oversaw the city's COVID-19 vaccination program when the national government began its vaccination program in early 2021.

== 2022 vice presidential election ==
Duterte was considered by many political commentators as her father's successor after her role as a power broker in the 2019 midterm elections. As early as April 2021, an organization called Inday Sara Is My President (ISIP Pilipinas Movement) was formed by national convenor and Duterte security aide Ramil Madriaga and lawyer Ryan Rey S. Quilala, the latter of whom being Duterte's former professor at San Sebastian College. On July 7, 2021, the People's Reform Party (PRP) signaled their support early on for Duterte's potential presidential run, with Duterte stating two days later that she was open to running for president. On September 9, she said she would not, since her father, the sitting president, would run for vice president, and they agreed that only one should run for a national position. However, he did not file his candidacy for vice president by October 2, but she did not file a candidacy for any national position, running instead for reelection as mayor of Davao City. She later withdrew her candidacy for reelection as Davao City mayor on November 9. Her brother Sebastian, incumbent vice mayor of Davao City, ran in her stead. On November 11, she resigned from Hugpong ng Pagbabago and joined Lakas–CMD in Silang, Cavite. There, she sponsored the wedding of Jed Patricio and Gianna Revilla, the daughter of party chairman and senator Bong Revilla. Six days later, she became the chairperson of Lakas–CMD, succeeding Revilla. On November 19, she rejoined Hugpong ng Pagbabago as its chairperson.

=== Candidacy and campaign ===
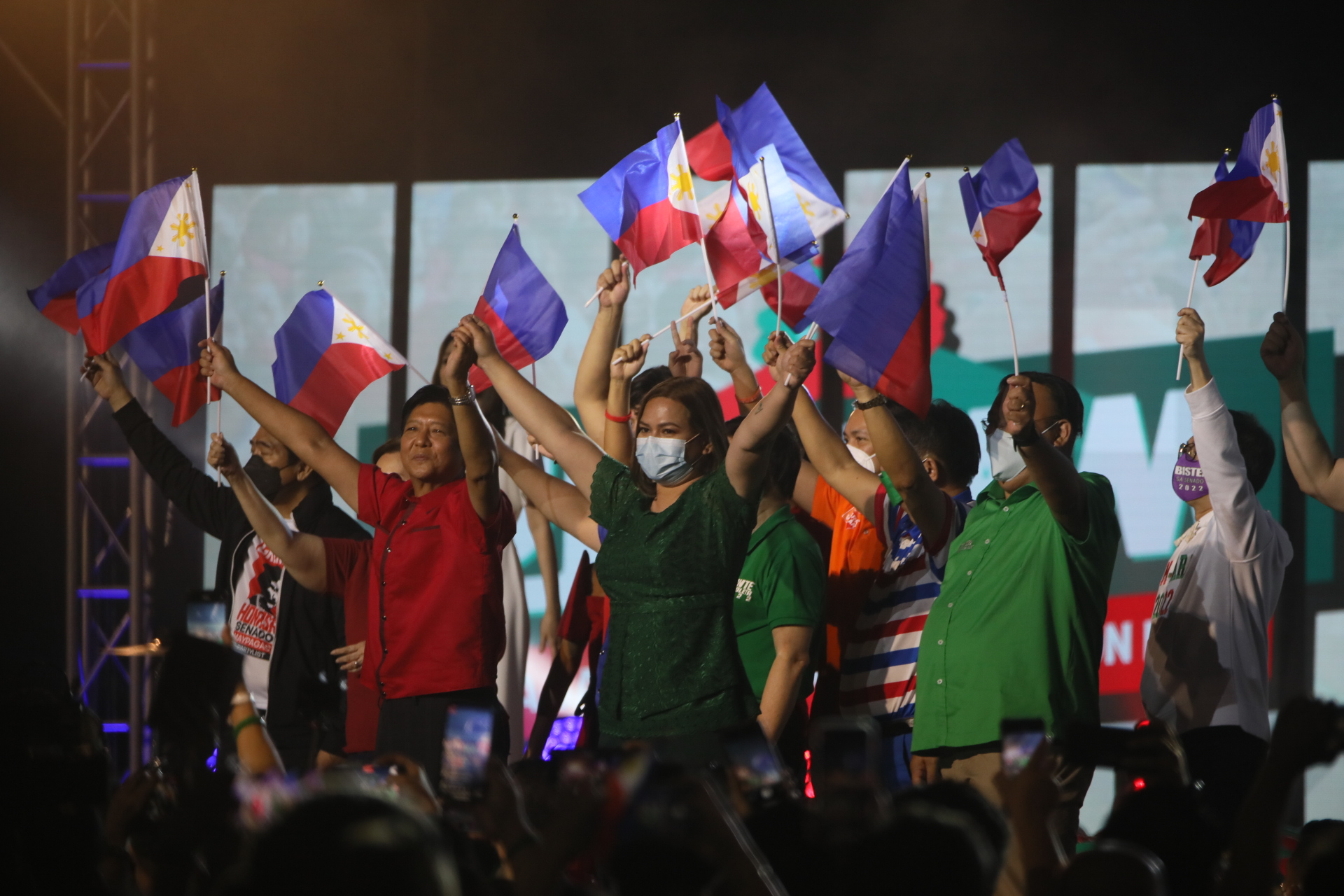
Marcos and Duterte with the UniTeam slate during their proclamation rally at the Philippine Arena on February 8, 2022

On November 13, she filed her candidacy for Vice President of the Philippines under Lakas–CMD for the 2022 Philippine vice presidential election. She said this was to meet her supporters halfway, who had been previously asking her to run for president, and credited Senator Imee Marcos with convincing her to run for the position. She was then adopted and endorsed by Partido Federal ng Pilipinas as the running mate of former senator Bongbong Marcos, and soon afterwards was endorsed by the PRP. Their alliance was named UniTeam.

Duterte became the vice president-elect, winning the election with 32,208,417 votes with a margin of 22 million over her closest rival, Senator Francis Pangilinan. She became the first vice president to be elected by a majority since the 1986 elections and the largest majority since 1969. She also earned the most votes for any office in a single-winner election in Philippine history. She was also the first vice president from Davao City, the youngest to become vice president at the age of 44, the third woman to hold the post after Gloria Macapagal Arroyo and Leni Robredo, the third vice president who is a child of a president after Salvador Laurel and Arroyo, the third vice president to come from Mindanao after Emmanuel Pelaez and Teofisto Guingona Jr., and the fourth Cebuano-speaking vice president overall (after Sergio Osmeña, Carlos P. Garcia, and Pelaez). She and Marcos were also the first presidential ticket to win together since the 2004 elections.

== Vice presidency (2022–present) ==
Vice Presidential styles of Sara Duterte
- Reference style: Her Excellency, The Honorable
- Spoken style: Your Excellency
- Alternative style: Madame Vice President

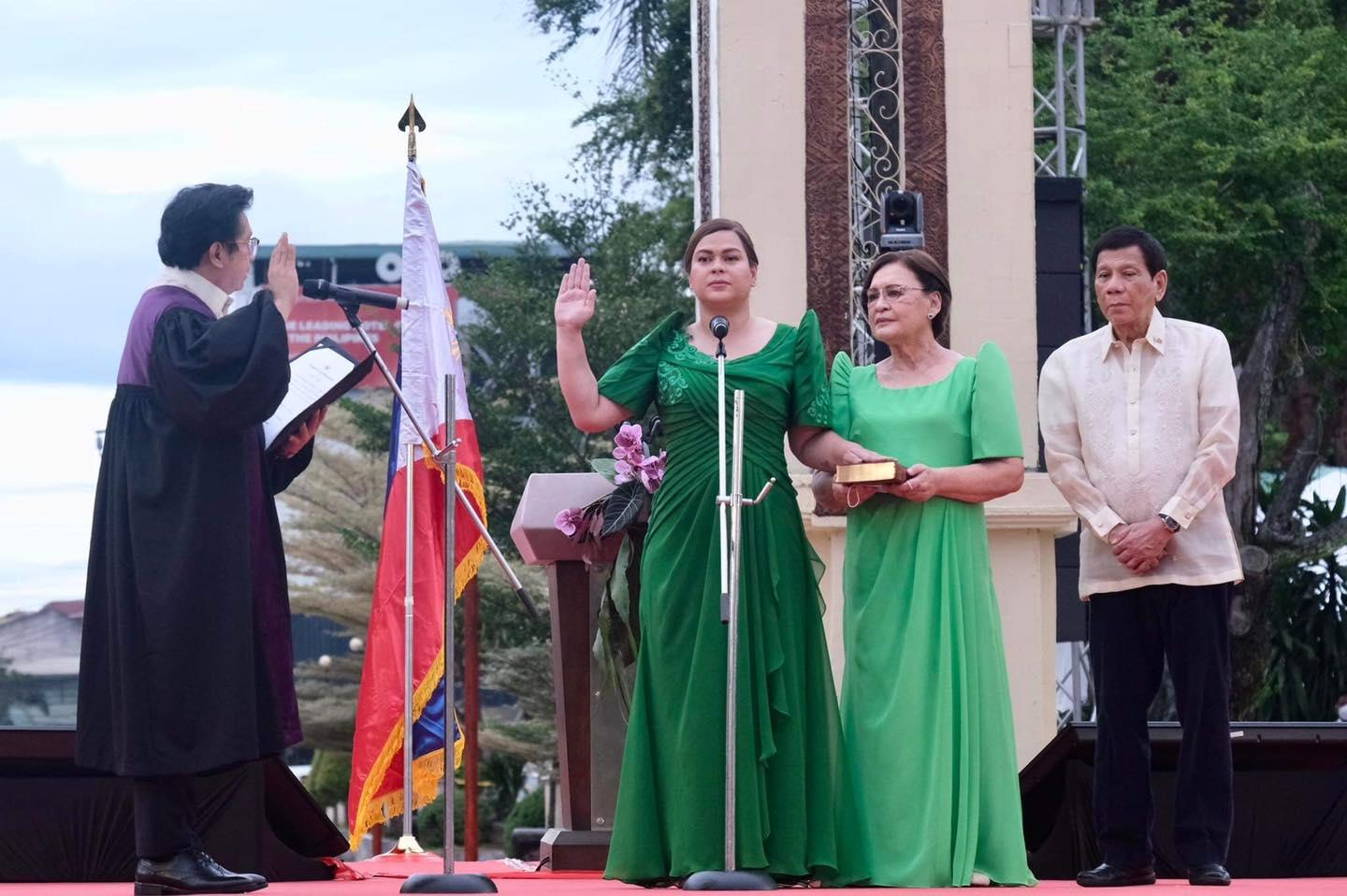
Duterte taking her oath of office before Associate Justice Ramon Paul Hernando in Davao City on June 19, 2022, with her parents Elizabeth Zimmerman and outgoing President Rodrigo Duterte as witnesses

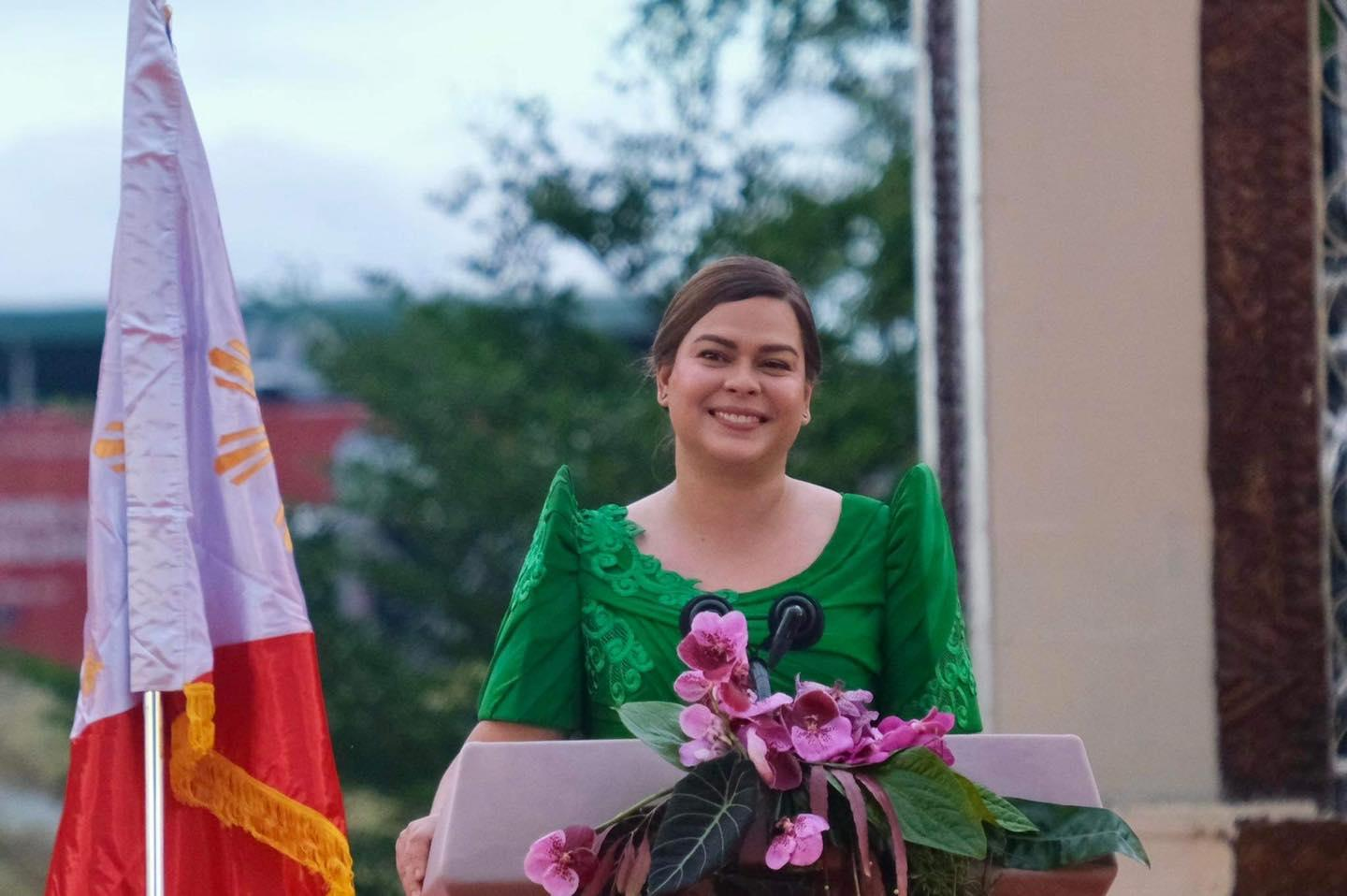
Duterte during her inauguration on June 19, 2022

Before her inauguration, on May 11, 2022, Marcos announced that Duterte agreed to join his cabinet as Secretary of Education, although she earlier expressed interest in becoming the Secretary of National Defense. According to Duterte, she chose to become the Education secretary instead to avoid "intrigues" about her loyalty to the administration. She was inaugurated in Davao City on June 19, 2022, but only officially started her term on June 30 in accordance with the constitution. At her request, the oath-taking, which was the first in Mindanao for a vice president, was administered by Associate Justice Ramon Paul Hernando, her former professor at San Beda College of Law.

=== Programs and policies ===
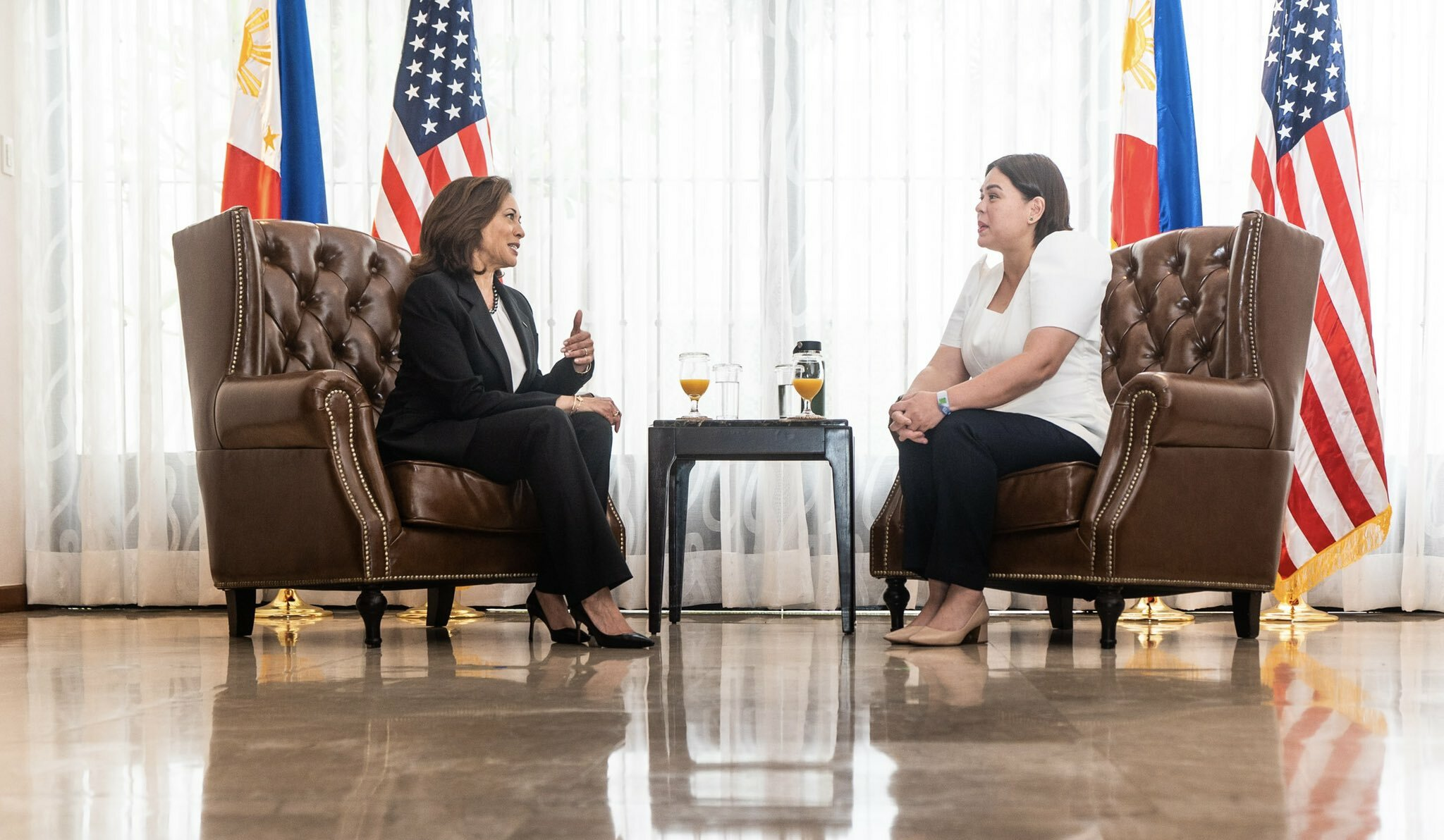
Duterte with U.S. Vice President Kamala Harris in Manila on November 21, 2022

In her first day as the vice president, Duterte established satellite offices for the Office of the Vice President (OVP) in Cebu City, Dagupan, Davao City, Tacloban, Tandag, and Zamboanga City. The seat of the Office of the Vice President would then be transferred from Quezon City Reception House to Cybergate Plaza in Mandaluyong, which is closer to the headquarters of the Department of Education (DepEd) in Pasig where she also held office as its secretary.

On August 3, 2022, Duterte, alongside the Department of Transportation, launched the Libreng Sakay Program (lit. transl. Free Rides Program) of the OVP, providing free rides as an effort to de-congest the roads during peak hours. It initially launched five buses bestowed by the department, deploying two in Metro Manila (plying the EDSA Carousel route) and one each in Bacolod, Cebu (plying Mandaue, Lapu-Lapu City, and Cebu City), and Davao City.

On October 9, 2022, the OVP, in collaboration with the DepEd and the Department of Health, began deploying "Kalusugan Food Trucks" (lit. transl. Health Food Trucks) in select areas nationwide to address malnutrition among school children, wherein the trucks regularly stop at identified schools and institutions with malnutrition and hunger problems among children, with the project following a 120-day feeding program menu recommended by the DOH's National Nutrition Council.

On March 9, 2023, Duterte launched the "Mag Negosyo Ta 'Day" program which aims to financially support women and LGBTQIA+ members, alongside other marginalized sectors, by facilitating a business-friendly environment and encouraging the growth of micro, small, and medium enterprises. The program was adopted by the OVP from Duterte's similar initiative during her tenure as mayor of Davao City.

Following her designation as the co-vice chairperson of the National Task Force to End Local Communist Armed Conflict (NTF-ELCAC) on May 11, 2023, she issued a warning to communist rebels and said the rebels' "so-called protracted war" must end. On May 29, Duterte kicked off a nationwide distribution of one million bags containing school supplies and dental kits as well as the planting of one million trees under the OVP's “PagbaBAGo: A Million Learners and Trees” program in partnership with DepEd and the Department of Environment and Natural Resources. As of October 2023, a total of 64,860 PagbaBAGo bags were distributed by the OVP to school children and planted 178,167 trees.

From July 2022 to October 2023, Duterte's OVP was able to provide ₱1.2 billion worth of medical assistance to 106,958 beneficiaries, with the office's burial assistance program providing ₱130.3 million worth of assistance to 22,470 families. Within the same time period, the office's Libreng Sakay Program served 523,263 commuters in Metro Manila, 89,605 commuters in Bacolod City, 60,409 commuters in Davao City, and 99,633 commuters in Cebu City. The OVP's Disaster Operations Center also conducted 162 relief operations and extended assistance worth ₱69.1 million to 115,045 families in times of disasters and calamities.

==== Foreign trips ====
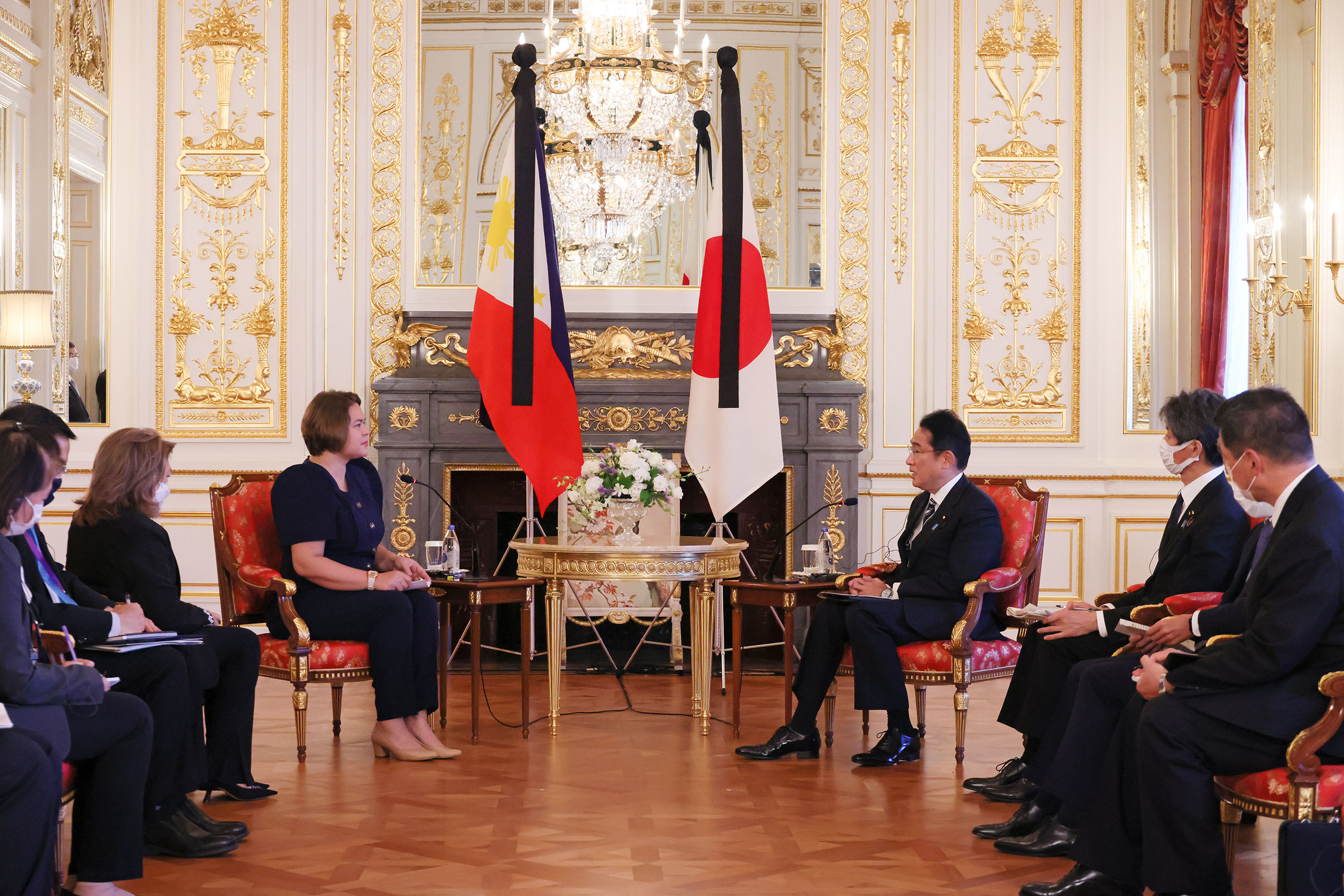
Duterte with Japanese Prime Minister Fumio Kishida in Tokyo on September 26, 2022

Duterte visited Japan on September 26–27, 2022 as the Philippines' representative to the state funeral of former Prime Minister Shinzo Abe. During her visit, she conducted several education-related activities as she visited an elementary school in Japan and met with officials from the Ministry of Education, Culture, Sports, Science and Technology. Duterte also met with several Japanese officials and paid a courtesy call on Japanese Prime Minister Fumio Kishida.

In line with her duties as president of the Southeast Asian Ministers of Education Organization, Duterte visited Brunei in June 2023 wherein she met with the crown prince Al-Muhtadee Billah, the education minister Romaizah Salleh, and some overseas Filipino workers. On June 13–14, Duterte visited Singapore wherein she met with President Halimah Yacob, Prime Minister Lee Hsien Loong, and other officials to discuss the strong bilateral relationship between both countries. Vice President Duterte also visited the Southeast Asian Ministers of Education Organization Regional Language Centre.

Duterte then paid an official visit to South Korea in September 2023 in order to serve as keynote speaker at the Global Education and Innovation Summit where she spoke about the disruption caused by the pandemic as well as the uncertainties posed by the boom of artificial intelligence. Afterwards, she met with South Korean Deputy Prime Minister and Education Minister Lee Ju-ho to discuss opportunities for cooperation in learning advancements. In February 2024, Duterte visited Malaysia and met with Malaysian Minister of Education Fadhlina Sidek and Deputy Prime Minister Dato' Sri Fadillah Yusof.

=== Secretary of Education (2022–2024) ===
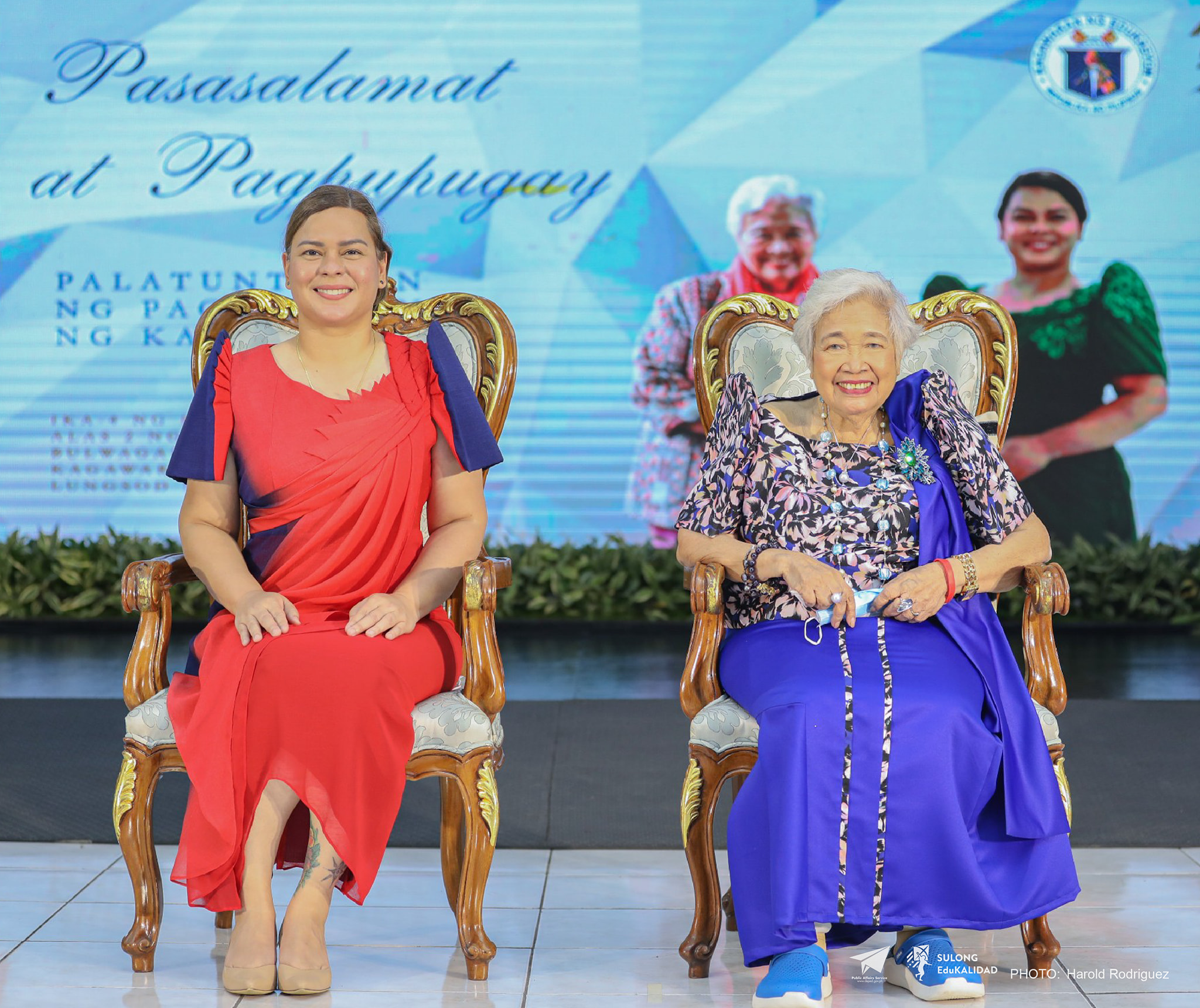
Duterte and her predecessor as Secretary of Education, Leonor Briones, during the turnover ceremony at the DepEd headquarters in Pasig

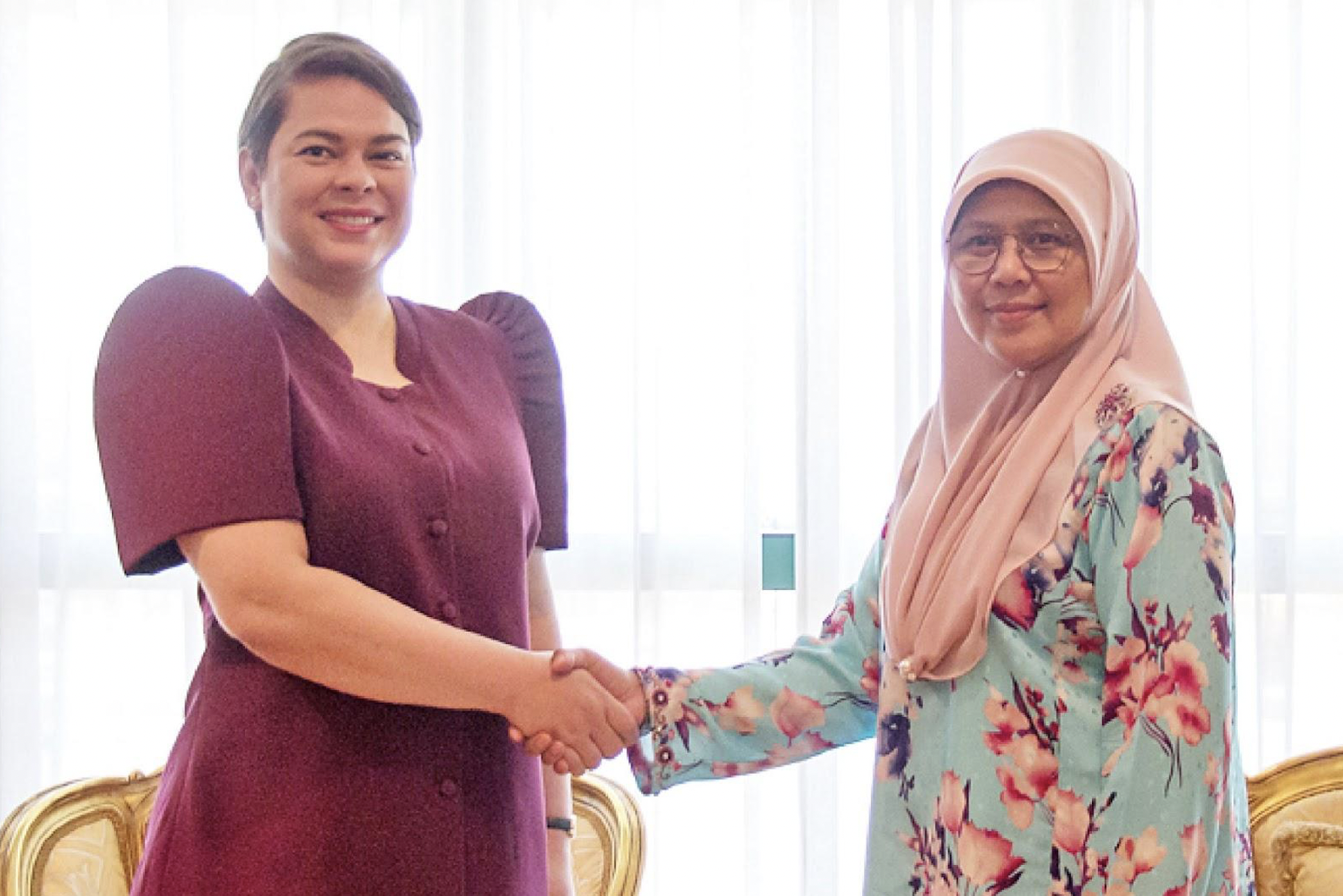
Duterte with Brunei Minister of Education Romaizah Salleh

As the concurrent Education Secretary, Duterte was responsible for planning further the transition to the resumption of mandatory face-to-face classes at all basic education schools in the Philippines, which was put on hold since 2020 due to the risks brought out by the COVID-19 pandemic, for the school year 2022–2023. She issued her first department order, the Department Order No. 034 dated July 11, 2022, wherein schools may either opt for five-day in-person classes or blended modality from the opening of classes on August 22 to October 31 before shifting to mandatory in-person classes observing physical distancing when necessary by November 2 onwards. She also declared that school uniforms and vaccination among students would be optional for the upcoming school year. She also mulled institutionalizing blended learning only in select schools and areas with special circumstances, including schools with possibly unrepaired or unfinished buildings. Earlier, before taking office, Duterte also called the reinstatement of the mandatory Reserve Officers’ Training Corps (ROTC), which would later gain more support especially from legislators and government officials.

On November 25, 2022, Duterte established the Learner Rights and Protection Office (LRPO) under DepEd and launched its Telesafe Contact Center Helpline to address child abuse and strengthen child protection.

On January 20, 2023, Duterte presented the “current state” of the country's basic education through the Basic Education Report (BER) 2023, wherein she identified the challenges faced by the department when it came to the delivery of basic education and outlined the plans that are set to be implemented by the department. As the Secretary of Education, Duterte was elected as the President of the Southeast Asian Ministers of Education Organization (SEAMEO) succeeding Singapore's Education Minister, Chan Chun Sing, on February 8, 2023, during the 52nd SEAMEO Council Meeting held in Manila.

To maintain a learning-focused environment and ensure teachers are not burdened with non-work-related matters, in March 2023, Duterte signed a department order prohibiting teachers from joining volunteer work and extracurricular activities during school hours. In May that year, she said she intended to include mandatory scouting in the K-12 curriculum for young Filipino boys to instill in them an enduring love for the country. In July 2023, Duterte signed a department order starting a National Learning Recovery Program designed to improve students’ numeracy and literacy and strengthen the education sector's learning recovery.

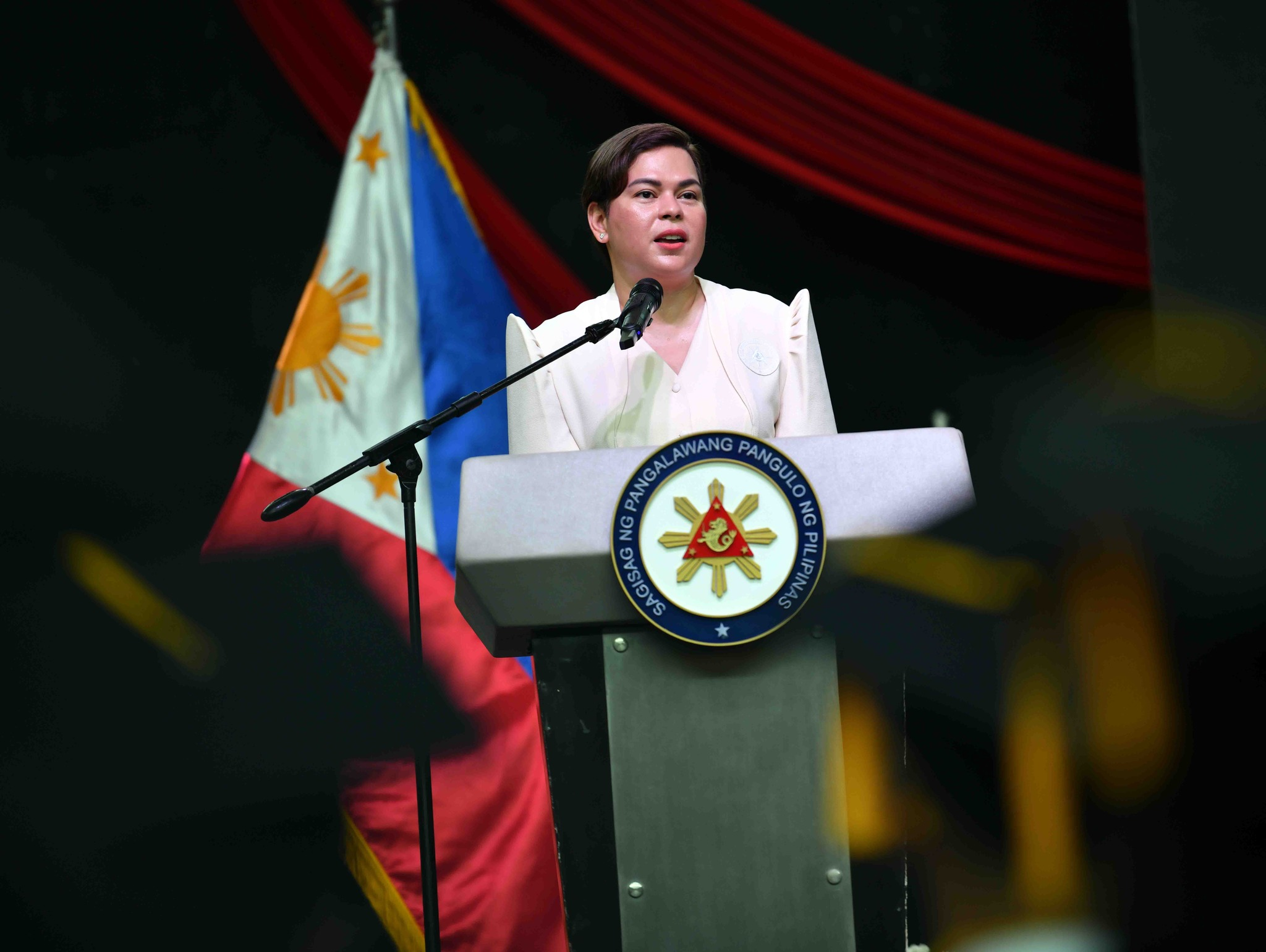
Duterte during the 2nd PSHS-ZPRC Commencement Exercises in Dipolog on June 6, 2023

In August 2023, DepEd launched a new "less congested" and revised version of K–12, called the "Matatag curriculum". This version of the K–12 reduced the learning areas for students from seven to five and removed Mother Tongue as a separate subject; it also emphasized a "Makabansa" learning area to instill Filipino identity and nationalism among students. It will be implemented in phases from 2024 to 2028 on Kinder and Grades 1 to 10. The Matatag curriculum pilot implementation was well received by teachers, students, and parents. The Matatag Agenda and the Basic Education Development Plan 2030 as formulated by the DepEd under Duterte was later approved by President Marcos as the national policy and plan for basic education on April 27, 2024.

In September 5, 2023, Duterte announced that school teachers nationwide would have a 30-day straight break without volunteer work for the School Year 2023–2024. In the same month, the DepEd also signed a memorandum of agreement with the Government Service Insurance System (GSIS) establishing more express lanes in all GSIS offices for teachers and DepEd personnel. Following reports citing the Commission on Audit which flagged DepEd for failing to remit nearly P5 billion in premium contributions and loan amortizations to the GSIS in 2022, DepEd stated in December 2023 that it has conducted reconciliation activities with the GSIS regarding its balance at all levels of the department.

Other reforms implemented by Duterte as education secretary was the establishment of a procurement strand within the department to streamline service delivery and resource acquisition, as well as the creation of a school infrastructure and facilities strand to tackle the shortage of classrooms and equipment, which resulted in the construction of 2,201 classrooms, 45 Last Mile School classrooms, and 880 health facilities by the end of 2023, although this fell short of the 5,000 to 6,000 classroom target previously set by the department for the year. She had also signed a memorandum of agreement with non-profit organization Go Negosyo in November 2023 to teach Filipino youth about business and agriculture through various programs.

Under her tenure, DepEd also aimed to enhance the digital infrastructure of schools. Satellite internet was provided to 2,000 schools, while 25 schools were selected for Starlink connections as of 2023. The DepEd also introduced "Digital Education Learning Carts" and mobile computer labs equipped with laptops, charging carts, and Smart TVs. However, the budget for the department's Computerization Fund remained underutilized, with only ₱10.2 billion being obligated out of the ₱20.5 billion allocation in the 2023 budget. Additionally, only ₱2.18 billion out of ₱11.36 billion allocated for computers, laptops, and television sets had been utilized. Thousands of laptops intended for personnel were also not delivered. By 2023, the ratio between the number of teachers for each computer remained at 1 to 30, while the student to computer ratio was 1 to 9.

Under Duterte's leadership, the Philippines ranked bottom among 64 countries in the creative thinking assessment of the Programme for International Student Assessment (PISA), with a mean score of 14, compared to the global average of 33. The assessment for which the rankings are based on were done in May 2022, before she took office as education secretary. Duterte said that the results revealed an “uncomfortable truth” about the state of country’s education system, but that efforts were in place to improve future PISA results.

On January 25, 2024, Duterte delivered her second BER. The following day, Duterte signed a department order which removed administrative tasks from teachers’ workloads with the aim of enabling teachers to maximize their time in actual classroom teaching. This was then augmented by the signing of an additional order on April 30 which limited teachers' work hours to eight hours a day, six of which are devoted to actual classroom teaching while the remaining two is reserved for ancillary tasks.

On May 10, 2024, the DepEd signed a Joint Memorandum Circular with the Technical Education and Skills Development Authority (TESDA), Commission on Higher Education (CHED), and Department of Labor and Employment (DOLE) for the country's senior high school graduates to be provided with free national certification assessments, the accreditation of DepEd senior high schools as assessment centers, along with the training and certification of technical vocational livelihood (TVL) teachers as Technical and Vocational Education and Training (TVET) competency assessors, as a means of boosting the employment opportunities of the country's senior high school students.

Amid a worsening rift between the Marcos and Duterte political clans, on June 19, 2024, Duterte resigned as Education Secretary. She formally handed over the post to her successor, Senator Sonny Angara, on July 18, 2024.

=== Rift with Marcos and the House ===
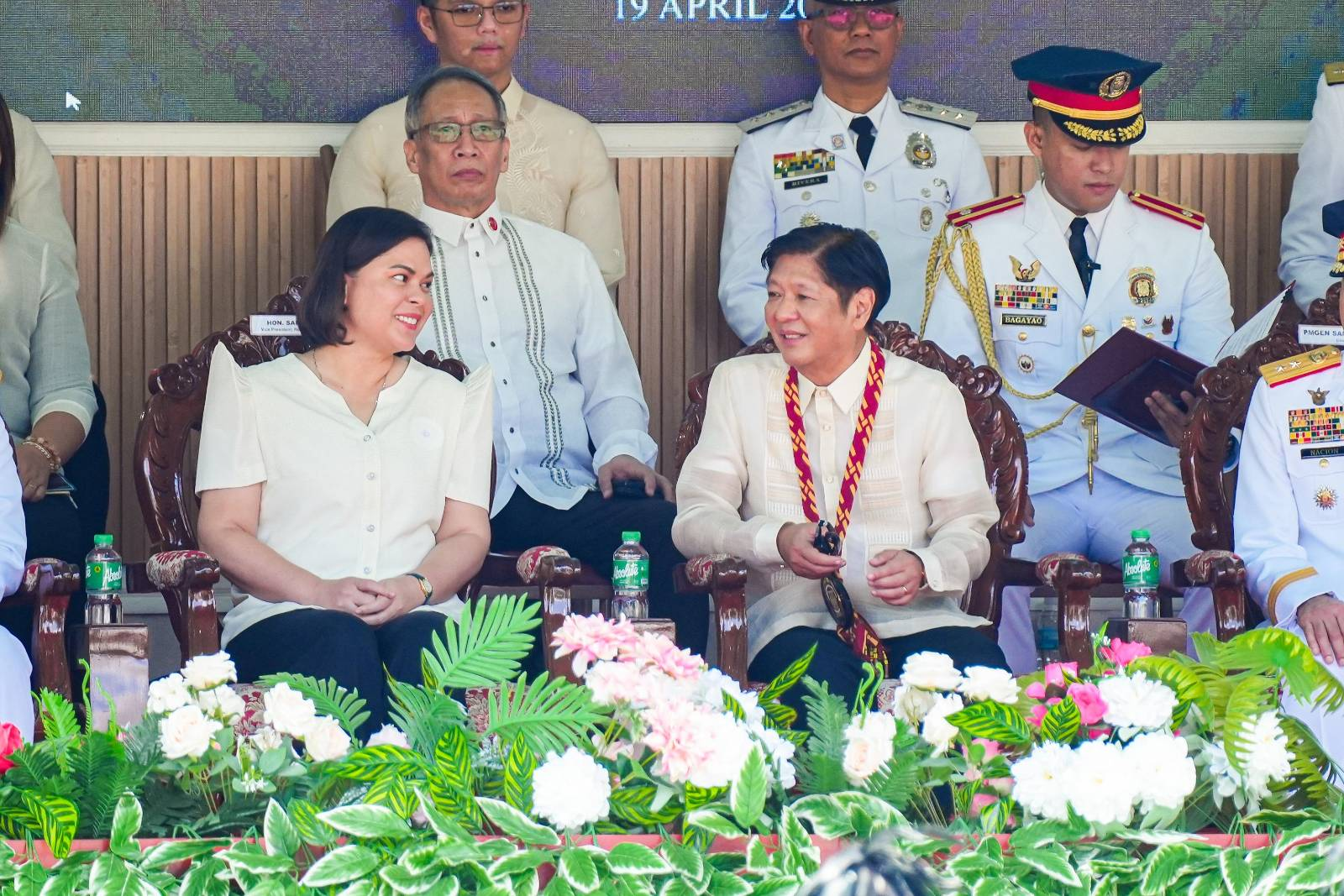
Duterte (left) and President Marcos (right) during the 45th Philippine National Police Academy Commencement Exercises, Camp General Mariano N. Castañeda, Silang, Cavite, April 19, 2024

On May 19, 2023, Duterte resigned from Lakas–CMD, stating that her leadership "cannot be poisoned by political toxicity." Her resignation came a few days after her political ally Gloria Macapagal Arroyo, was demoted from her senior deputy speaker position in the House of Representatives following rumors that Arroyo allegedly planned to unseat Bongbong Marcos' cousin, House Speaker Martin Romualdez. In a speech in June 2023, Duterte acknowledged Marcos' support for her but stated that Marcos' middle name, Romualdez, was "unmentionable" amid reports of a falling out between her and the Speaker.

Duterte's relationship with the House worsened when her office's, as well as the education department's, use of confidential funds was questioned by the Philippine House Committee on Appropriations and the Philippine Senate Committee on Finance. The House would later remove her requested confidential funds from the proposed 2024 budget, while Duterte later rescinded her request for confidential funds, citing their "divisiveness."

In January 2024, former senator Antonio Trillanes claimed that Duterte was included as a “secondary respondent" in a crime against humanity case pending before the International Criminal Court (ICC). Arturo Lascañas, a retired police officer in Davao City, implicated Duterte as having had a role in extrajudicial killings (EJKs) after succeeding her father, Rodrigo Duterte, to become Davao City mayor in 2010. Duterte responded by saying that she never engaged with the Davao Death Squad (DDS) throughout her terms as Davao City mayor and vice mayor, and that she would face any charges only before judges and courts in the Philippines.

In early 2024, Duterte lamented that she was being subjected to an intensified "demolition job" meant to destroy her reputation as a public servant. Amid a worsening rift between the Marcos and Duterte political clans, on June 19, 2024, Duterte resigned as Secretary of Education and co-vice chairperson of the NTF-ELCAC. Shortly after, Marcos announced that Senator Sonny Angara would replace Duterte as the new DepEd Secretary. Duterte's resignation took effect on July 19, 2024.

Duterte skipped Marcos' State of the Nation Address (SONA) on July 22, 2024, claiming to have appointed herself as the "designated survivor", a term she did not elaborate but is related to a contingency plan in the United States presidential line of succession. She went to Bohol for Bohol Day and attended the wake of Bohol Vice Governor Dionisio Victor Balite, who died on July 17. A day after Marcos' SONA, the Philippine National Police (PNP) relieved all 75 police officers previously assigned for Duterte's security, reducing her from a record-high of around 400, the most for any Philippine vice president in history. Despite the recall, she still retains over 300 security personnel, more than those assigned to Marcos. She described the recall as “a clear case of political harassment” and accused PNP Chief Rommel Marbil of lying. Marbil added that the recall was due to the absence of security threats against her and denied any "political pressure" influencing the decision.

On July 24, 2024, Duterte left the country for Germany for a personal trip with her mother, husband, and children some hours prior to the southwestern monsoon, enhanced by Typhoon Gaemi (locally called Carina), which caused significant rainfall and affected Luzon. She had received travel authority from the Office of the President on July 9. The OVP noted that while the trip's timing was unfortunate, the Disaster Operations Center remained ready to aid those affected by the typhoon, including a relief operation in Quezon City. Duterte revealed that during her trip to Germany, she spent her time with family and met with the Filipino community group Hakbang ng Maisug International Germany (HMIG) in Munich. Her departure faced criticism from netizens and Representative Edcel Lagman (Albay–1st) for perceived insensitivity during the crisis, though Senator Imee Marcos defended her, stating that Duterte didn't know that there would be a storm.

On August 7, 2024, Duterte publicly criticized the Marcos government and the House of Representatives over issues such as failures in disaster management, policing, healthcare reform, and the possible involvement of the International Criminal Court in investigating the Philippine drug war spearheaded by her father as president. Later that month, during the budget hearing for the OVP's 2025 budget, Duterte refused to answer questions regarding her office's budget. Unlike in previous years, where the House swiftly approved the OVP budget, the approval of the 2025 budget was deferred, while some congressmen criticized Duterte for her behavior during the hearing. Duterte nor any representative from her office did not attend the second budget hearing on September 10, and approval for the OVP budget was deferred again.

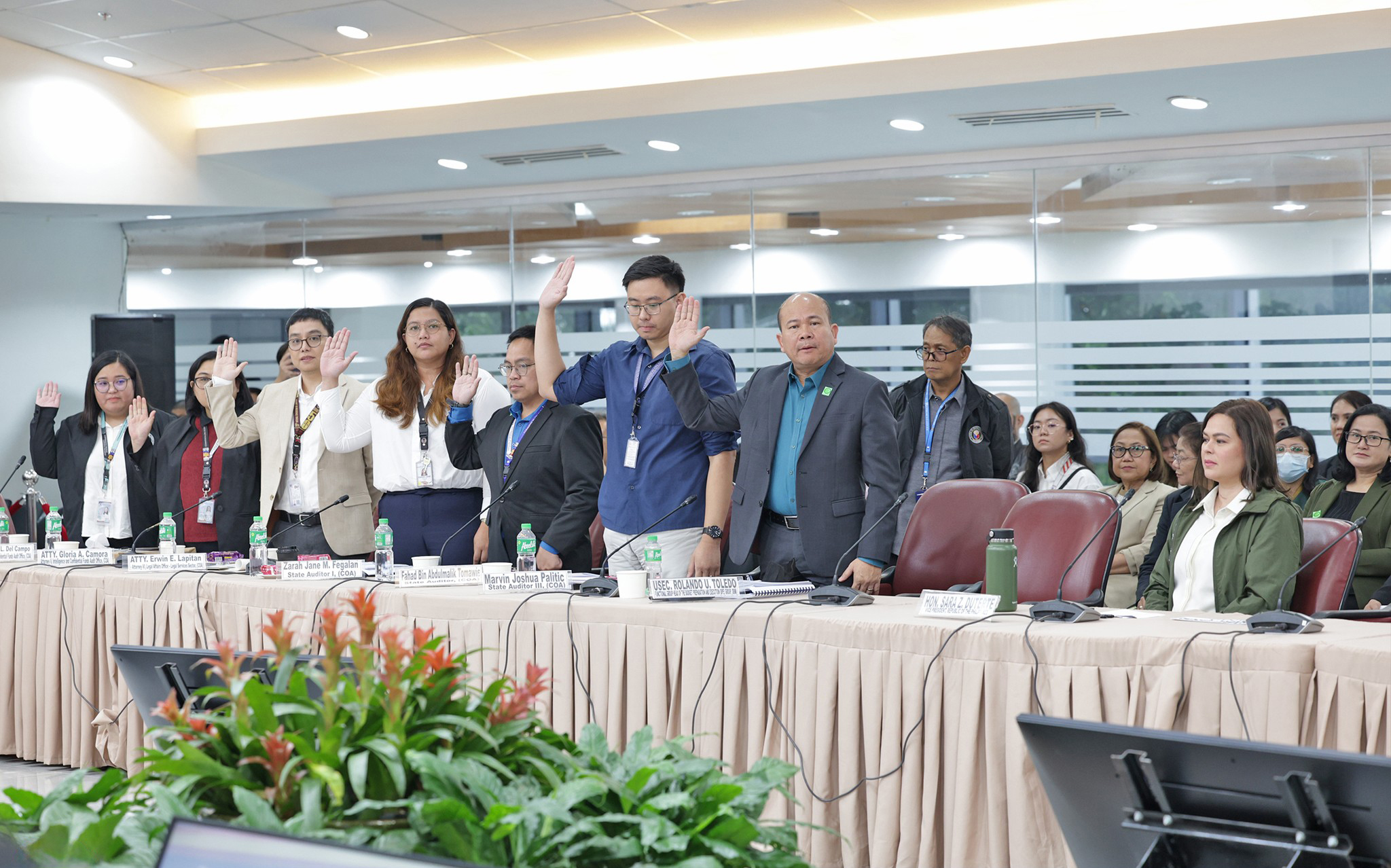
Duterte (far right) refused to take an oath at a congressional hearing on her office's budget utilization in September 2024.

On September 18, 2024, Duterte attended the House's inquiry about her office's alleged misuse of funds and refused to take an oath and answer questions. Additionally, when asked about her friendship with Marcos, she said they were never friends and merely running mates in the 2022 elections. Marcos responded, expressing he was "deceived" about their supposed friendship. On October 18, 2024, Duterte held a press conference at her office, where she discussed her fallout with Marcos, claiming he "does not know how to be president" and has led the country "on the road to hell." She also revealed that she once told Senator Imee Marcos that if attacks against her persisted, she would exhume former President Ferdinand Marcos' remains and discard them in the West Philippine Sea.

Don't worry for my security, ma'am, because I have already talked to someone. I said to him, "If I get killed, kill BBM, Liza Araneta and Martin Romualdez." No joke, no joke. I already instructed [someone], ma'am. If I die, I said "Do not stop, all right, as long as you have yet to kill them." And then he said "yes".

— Duterte's response to a vlogger's concern for her safety and question on how to "remedy" alleged government criminality, November 2024

The lower chamber's probe against Duterte and her office's alleged misuse of funds continued by November 2024. Several of Duterte's staff were cited in contempt for refusing to attend these hearings. On the sixth hearing, Duterte's chief of staff, Zuleika T. Lopez, was cited in contempt for undue interference; she would later be detained at a detention facility within the Batasang Pambansa Complex. Duterte stayed with Lopez overnight on November 21 and 22, despite only being allowed by the House to visit Lopez and not stay with her for the duration of her detainment. When Lopez was due to be transferred on the evening of November 22 by House authorities to the Correctional Institution for Women, Duterte obstructed the proceeding and stayed in the room where Lopez is detained, after which Lopez initiated a midnight press conference through Zoom.

=== Threat to assassinate Marcos ===
In the early morning of November 23, Duterte made an expletive-laden tirade against the Marcos administration during Lopez's press conference, wherein she claimed to have spoken with a contract killer to target President Marcos, his wife Liza, and House Speaker Romualdez in the event of her assassination. She made the claim in response to a vlogger's question over her security. Later that day, the administration deemed her threat against the president to be "clear and unequivocal" and thus treated as an "active threat" against the government. Duterte later clarified that her remarks were not serious threats but rather a reflection of her fear for her personal safety after hearing threats against her. Marcos pledged to prevent any "criminal attempts," but in response, Duterte stated she would not overlook the actions of the Marcos administration against her. She also claimed that the Marcos family was behind the assassination of former senator Ninoy Aquino. Romualdez called Duterte's claim of hiring a contract killer a direct threat to democracy. He also referred to the threat as "alarming and unprecedented." On November 26, 2024, the National Bureau of Investigation issued a subpoena to Duterte regarding her alleged assassination threat, which she eventually ignored. On September 4, 2026, a court in Quezon City issued an arrest warrant for grave threats against Duterte over her statements, posting bail the following day.

=== Confidential funds controversy ===
In 2022 and 2023, Duterte made use of confidential and intelligence funds for both the OVP and DepEd; the OVP under her predecessor did not make use of confidential funds. According to Duterte's chief of staff, due to the OVP's compartmentalized structure, she handled her confidential funds in direct coordination with her office's special disbursing officer Gina F. Acosta without any intermediary.

In 2022, the OVP had requested ₱250 million, although only half, ₱125 million, was granted. The report of the Commission on Audit (COA) later revealed that the entire fund was spent within 11 days. COA has also issued a notice of disallowance on the ₱73 million worth of such confidential funds in 2022. In 2023, the OVP was the fourth highest spender of confidential funds, spending a total of ₱375 million within the year, more than the combined total of confidential funds from the National Intelligence Coordinating Agency, National Security Council, and the National Bureau of Investigation.

During the plenary deliberations for the 2024 national budget in September 2023, Duterte requested Congress for confidential and intelligence funds worth ₱500 million for the OVP and ₱150 million for the DepEd. DepEd defended the use of confidential funds, stating that it was for gathering information and intelligence. The request would later be scrutinized by both chambers of Congress. Duterte dismissed claims that these funds were used inappropriately. She also defended the use of confidential funds, and branded critics against it as enemies of peace and the nation. In November 2023, Duterte eventually dropped both of her requests for confidential funds in response to the request being "divisive".

In 2024, the lower chamber's Committee on Good Government and Public Accountability started investigations against the vice president's alleged misuse of funds after the approval of the 2025 OVP budget was deferred. On September 25, a former DepEd undersecretary alleged that Duterte gave out cash gifts worth ₱50 thousand monthly; later on, another former official also came forward, claiming that they received similar envelopes but had stopped by late 2023, around the same time the issue of confidential funds was raised. By November 2024, acknowledgement receipts from her offices submitted to the COA were revealed. Several lawmakers have expressed their doubts on the authenticity of the receipts, highlighting irregularities such as uncommon and allegedly fictitious names as well as discrepancies in the dates and signatures. Duterte claimed that she has not seen the receipts. On December 9, 2024, the Philippine Statistics Authority reported that the names of 60% of the 677 individuals that were named as recipients of confidential funds from DepEd had no records in the national civil registry.

On December 5, 2025, Commission on Audit released the 2024 audit report, that there were no findings of loss or wastage of government funds or property of the financial statements of Duterte as of December 31, 2024. In April 2026, Ramil Madriaga, a former security aide of vice president Duterte, claimed that Duterte's 125 million confidential funds from her December 2022 withdrawal were used within one day, and not 11 days as indicated by the records.

=== Disbarment petition ===
Disbarred lawyer and Presidential Adviser for Poverty Alleviation Larry Gadon has filed a disbarment complaint against Duterte over alleged "assassination" threats. Gadon stated that President Marcos did not support the filing of the disbarment case against Duterte. On November 26, 2024, Supreme Court spokesperson Camille Ting revealed that an anonymous complaint had been filed against Duterte for her comments about President Ferdinand Marcos and added that two other disbarment cases filed during her time as mayor of Davao City.

=== Impeachments ===
==== First impeachment ====
On December 2, 2024, an impeachment complaint was filed in the House of Representatives against Duterte for 24 offenses including failure to account for her spending of confidential funds, involvement in extrajudicial killings and threatening the assassination of President Marcos and Romualdez. A second impeachment complaint was filed against her on December 4 for misuse of confidential funds. On December 19, a third impeachment complaint was filed against Duterte for betrayal of public trust.

Despite growing calls for Duterte's impeachment, Marcos has publicly voiced his opinion against impeaching her, calling it "a storm in a teacup" and considering the move inconsequential to the lives of Filipinos. Consequently, the Iglesia ni Cristo on December 4 has announced that it plans to hold a rally to oppose the impeachment efforts concurring with President Marcos' stance in November 2024 that efforts to remove Duterte from office is unconstructive. On January 13, 2025, more than 1.5 million INC members went to the "National Rally for Peace" at the Quirino Grandstand in Manila; 12 other sites also staged the rally across the country.

On February 5, 2025, the House of Representatives consolidated the three filed complaints into one complaint and voted to impeach Duterte on charges that include corruption, plotting to assassinate President Marcos, involvement in extrajudicial killings and incitement to insurrection and public disorder. The measure passed after 215 lawmakers voted in favor, significantly above the minimum 102 votes needed in the chamber. Although the verified complaint was immediately submitted to the Senate within the same day, Senate President Francis Escudero was noted to have taken a controversial interpretation of the constitutional term "forthwith" in holding an impeachment trial in the Senate, delaying the potential start of the trial to June when congressional sessions are resumed.

On June 10, 2025, the Senate convened as an impeachment court, but soon remanded the complaint back to the House of Representatives, requesting that the latter first confirm the impeachment's constitutionality and that it ask the then-upcoming 20th Congress if it was willing to continue the impeachment. A day later, the House adopted a resolution affirming that their impeachment complaint did not violate the constitution, and carried a motion deferring its acceptance of the remanded impeachment articles. The Supreme Court later unanimously nullified the complaint on July 25, 2025, ruling that it was "unconstitutional" for alleged procedural issues and not allowing Duterte to defend herself when the impeachment was filed. The decision, as written by Justice Marvic Leonen, has been heavily criticized by legal experts and former Supreme Court justices due to a conspicuous factual error and the addition of criteria for impeachment, warning that the latter would effectively make the future filing of impeachment complaints against government officials more difficult. Due to constitutional restrictions, no further impeachment complaint can be filed against Duterte until February 6, 2026, one year after her impeachment. On August 4, 2025, the House of Representatives filed a motion for reconsideration to the Supreme Court regarding its ruling, which was upheld in January 2026. Despite the motion, the Senate voted to archive Duterte's impeachment on August 6, 2025, with Escudero arguing that the case can be revived when the Supreme Court reverses its initial decision.

==== Second impeachment ====
On February 2, 2026, two new impeachment complaints were filed against Duterte in the House of Representatives on charges of betrayal of public trust in the usage of confidential funds. On May 11, 2026, a majority of the House of Representatives voted to impeach Duterte, sending the case to a Senate trial.

Ahead of the trial, a pro-Duterte Senate majority installed the Duterte-friendly Alan Peter Cayetano as Senate president. Senator Ronald dela Rosa, who was evading arrest on ICC charges in the Senate building, cast the deciding vote.

=== Unexplained transactions worth P4.4 billion ===
The Anti–Money Laundering Council (AMLC) admitted during court hearings that they received transaction reports in the bank accounts of Vice President Sara Duterte and her husband, Manases Carpio, covering financial transactions totaling P4.4 billion, in connection with allegations that Duterte amassed unexplained wealth. AMLC Executive Director Ronel Buenaventura testified that they found 666 covered transaction reports (CTR) and 55 suspicious transaction reports (STRs) which covered approximately P4.4 billion. Duterte has not released any solid justification for her unexplained wealth; rather, her lawyers insisted on being granted more time for them to prepare their responses instead.

=== China funds involvement ===
The Anti–Money Laundering Council (AMLC) has also confirmed that Sara Duterte and her husband received P319 million in remittances from China through Duterte-linked Calle 88 Foods Corporation, while P150 million were siphoned as "donation" by China to Duterte's Malasakit Foundation. Additionally, investigative journalists confirmed that the website of the Duterte-linked Calle 88 Foods Corporation directly goes to the official website of the Embassy of China. The China-sourced funding for a Philippine vice president was previously noted as a major concern by the defense establishment amid speculations that the Dutertes are Chinese-sponsored politicians.

=== Drug money involvement ===
Additionally, the Anti–Money Laundering Council (AMLC) has confirmed that she received P22.32 million across three transactions (P14.8 million in one of them) from alleged drug lord Sammy Uy, totalling P181.6 million in payments via cashier’s and personal checks to various members of the Duterte family from 2011 to 2013 alone.

=== Arrest of Rodrigo Duterte ===
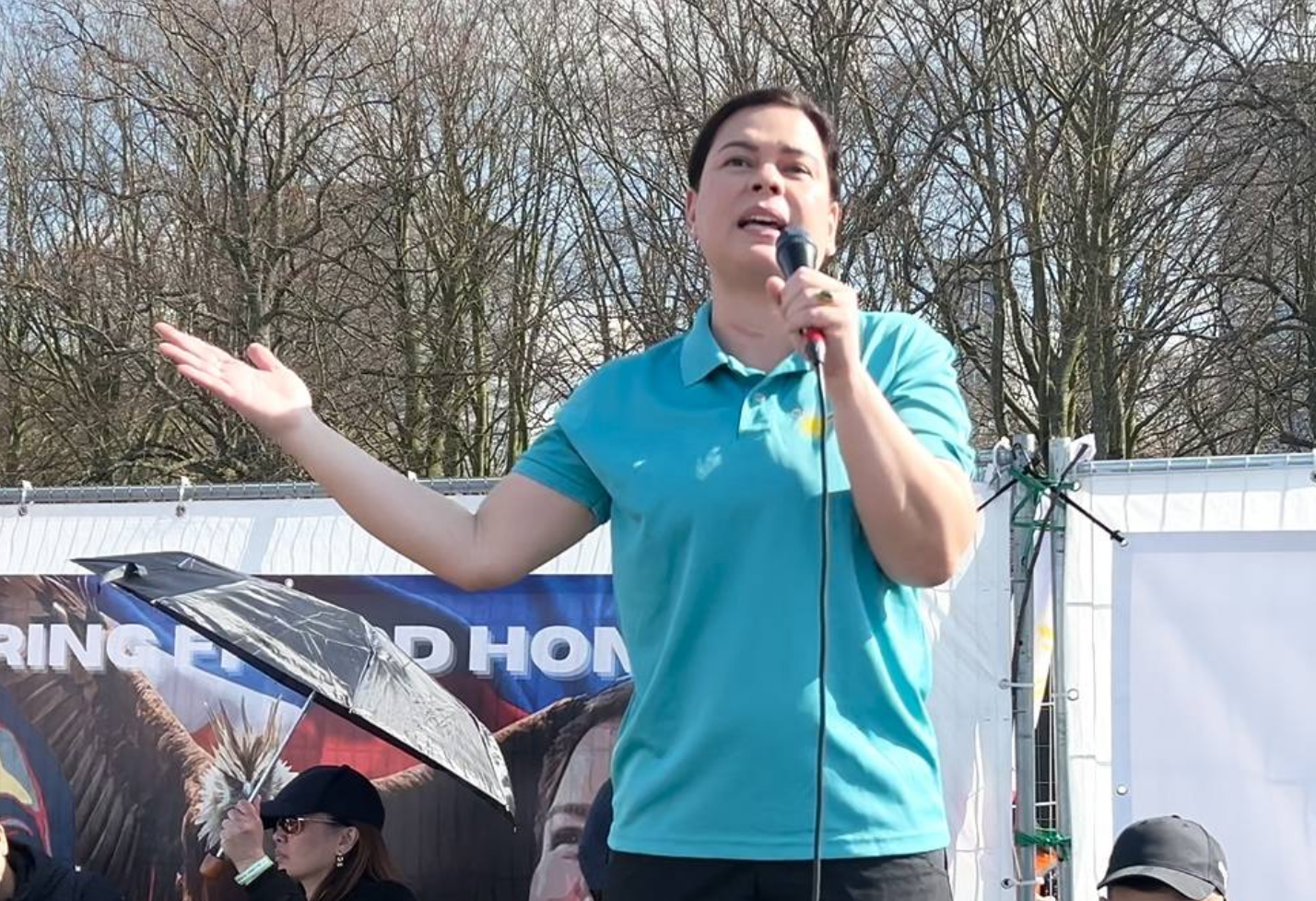
Duterte addresses supporters at Malieveld in The Hague, Netherlands, on March 23, 2025, calling for her father's release and return to the Philippines.

On March 11, 2025, Sara's father, former Philippine president Rodrigo Duterte, was arrested in Manila on the basis of an International Criminal Court (ICC) warrant charging him with crimes against humanity. Sara Duterte released a statement that her father's detention was "a blatant affront to our sovereignty and an insult to every Filipino who believes in our nation’s independence". Shortly after 11 p.m. PHT (UTC+08:00), a government-chartered private jet carrying Duterte along with his legal counsel, Salvador Medialdea, departed from Ninoy Aquino International Airport. Minutes after, President Bongbong Marcos held a televised press conference where he revealed that the flight would eventually continue to The Hague in the Netherlands, where Duterte was set to be arraigned for the indictment on charges of crimes against humanity at the ICC. The following morning, Sara Duterte herself departed Manila for Amsterdam to support her father. On March 14, 2025, Duterte publicly disclosed that she would not return to Philippines for an unspecified period, stating that she would focus on forming her father's legal team. The next day, Duterte stated that she would not return to the Philippines until another family relative could arrive in the Netherlands to also ensure that her father would not be left alone. On April 7, 2025, she returned to the Philippines after a month of being with her detained father. Two weeks later, Sara Duterte formally endorsed Imee Marcos and Camille Villar in the Senate elections.

== 2028 presidential campaign ==
On February 18, 2026, Duterte officially declared her candidacy for president in 2028.

== Political positions ==
Duterte has been described as populist. The continuation of the governance style associated with her father under Dutertismo, creating a perception for law-and-order governance and administrative continuity, while utilizing regionalism to gain bases and supporting foreign policies that favor the Duterte family's allies such as China and Netanyahu-controlled Israel.

=== AI, troll farms, and fake news ===
Duterte sees nothing wrong with the usage of AI, especially when used politically in her favor. When asked about her views on the proposed controversial AI international initiative, Pax Silica, she responded that she has no clue about it.

She has also appealed to the public about "troll farms" operating against her, however, verified news have also confirmed that the Duterte family itself operates their own troll farms to establish themselves in government and attack their enemies. Reports also note that Duterte trolls have been funded previously by China, a political ally of the Duterte family.

She has appealed before to stop spreading fake news, although she herself has previously been accused of indulging in fake news. Fact-checkers and experts have pointed out Duterte's pathological lying.

=== Moro conflict ===
After the Mamasapano clash between the Special Action Force (SAF) and Jemaah Islamiyah occurred in 2015 that led to the deaths of 44 SAF members, Duterte had her profile pictures on Facebook and Instagram set to memorial images that read: "Rest in peace SAF 44", which lasted up to 2022.

=== Communist conflict ===
Duterte opposes government peace talks with the Communist Party of the Philippines-New People's Army-National Democratic Front (CPP-NPA-NDF). After the Marcos administration agreed to resume peace talks with the CPP-NPA-NDF, in December 2023, she called the peace talks "a pact with the devil", warning that the communist rebels were insincere in reaching a settlement with the government.

=== Federalism ===
Duterte expressed her opposition to federalism during her reelection campaign for Davao City mayor in 2019, stating that it would further empower "local warlords" in Mindanao and "worsen [the] situation". However, she added that instituting federalism remains to be a decision of Congress and the president.

=== Apollo Quiboloy ===
Duterte has expressed support for religious leader and her father's ally, Apollo Quiboloy, who had been indicted by the FBI, sanctioned by the U.S. Magnitsky Act, and is the subject of various probes by the Philippine Senate and House of Representatives over allegations of sexual abuse and human trafficking, among other things. Duterte stated that the probes conducted by the Philippine Congress were "unjust" and "violent", and deprived Quiboloy of due process. Following the serving of arrest warrants of Quiboloy in June 2024, Duterte called for a just and humane law enforcement following what she described as the use of excessive force by the police. On August 25, 2024, she condemned the "gross abuse of police power" involved in the Philippine National Police (PNP) executing an arrest warrant against Quiboloy at the Kingdom of Jesus Christ (KOJC) compound in Davao City. She also expressed her regret in encouraging KOJC adherents to support her 2022 running mate, Bongbong Marcos. On August 30, 2024, Duterte visited the wake of a KOJC member who died from a heart attack while manning a watchtower during the first day of the police raid. Two days later, Duterte attended the KOJC's 39th anniversary event at the compound where she reiterated her support for the church organization and apology for supporting Marcos.

=== Pro-China positions ===
Sara Duterte with Chinese vice president Wang Qishan.

Duterte has been embroiled in numerous controversies concerning her close relationship with the Chinese Communist Party which administers the government of China.

In September 2022, Duterte sent the viral Fei shang, gao shing video of herself to China, where she spoke in the Chinese language and personally greeted Chinese president Xi Jinping, congratulating his government for the 73rd founding anniversary of communist rule in China, while Chinese military ships were bullying Filipino fisherfolk and Navy personnel in the West Philippine Sea.

In April 2024, after the Chinese Navy harassed and bullied Filipino fisherfolk in the West Philippine Sea, Duterte disregarded the treatment and stated that she has “no comment” on the issue.

Duterte has met and made friendly gestures to Chinese president Xi Jinping when her father was the Philippine president. As vice president, she has visited the Embassy of China multiple times, and personally spoke with Chinese state councilor and foreign minister Wang Yi, Chinese ambassador Huang Xilian, and even Zhao Long, the governor of Hainan which governs that the features in the West Philippine Sea like Scarborough Shoal and parts of the Spratly Islands that have been illegally occupied by China inside Philippine territory.

In October 2025, Duterte optimistically stated that she felt “upbeat” about China-Philippines relations after again speaking with the Chinese ambassador.

Duterte is also known for her continued refusal to support the country’s internationally-binding South China Sea Arbitration victory in the West Philippine Sea. Critics point out that her silence regarding the West Philippine Sea issue has “emboldened foreign encroachment and created confusion among Filipinos.” Various lawmakers have raised alarms that the Dutertes, including Sara, are pro-China for “a long time.”

In 2026, the Anti–Money Laundering Council (AMLC) confirmed that Sara Duterte and her husband received P319 million in remittances from China through Calle 88 Foods Corporation, while P150 million were siphoned as “donation” by the Chinese government to Duterte's Malasakit Foundation. Investigative journalists also confirmed that the website of the Duterte-linked Calle 88 Foods Corporation directly connects to the official website of the Embassy of China.

Pro-Filipino groups, including the Department of Defense, have expressed concern about having a Chinese-sponsored vice president, especially amid tensions in the West Philippine Sea.

Amid the investigations, various troll accounts surged across social media, defending Sara and the Duterte family. A probe was launched regarding the troll surge, as it was already confirmed and admitted by Rodrigo Duterte before that as far back as 2016, his family has been using online troll armies against their family's critics, while an independent investigation confirmed that many of these online troll armies originated from mainland China.

In October 2026, Sara Duterte accused Filipinos and the Philippine government of being the 'troublemaker' in the region, which was the same talking points stated by the Embassy of China against the Philippines.

=== Pro-Netanyahu Israel positions ===
Sara Duterte shakes hand with Israeli prime minister Benjamin Netanyahu as a sign of support.

Sara Duterte has personally met with Israeli prime minister Benjamin Netanyahu during a high-ranking state meeting. Sara Duterte shook hands with Netanyahu as a sign of support to Israel and the Netanyahu government during the Israeli–Palestinian conflict. In the same meeting, her father, then-president Rodrigo Duterte, falsely claimed that Sara was Jewish by blood.

Later in 2023, after Rodrigo Duterte adviced Israeli prime minister Benjamin Netanyahu to eliminate Palestinians and "make Gaza the world's biggest cemetery," Sara Duterte showed full support to Israel by visiting the Embassy of Israel in the Philippines amid the Gaza genocide, conveying her allyship with Israeli ambassador Ilan Fluss. Sara Duterte has met with Israel's ambassadors multiples times across her political career.

== Publications ==
Duterte wrote the children's book Isang Kaibigan (lit. transl. A Friend), launched in November 2023. With her office proposing a budget of ₱10 million for the distribution of 200,000 copies to public schools as part of the OVP's "PagbaBAGo" campaign, the book has gained controversy over the potential use of public funds to promote her own book and allegations of plagiarism due to similarities with Andy Runton's Owly: Just a Little Blue and the main character's similarities with Canva's graphics. The OVP has asserted the originality and copyright registration of the book. While intended for educational purposes, critics argued that the book serves as a political tool to enhance Duterte's image, a notion she denied by highlighting the book's focus on children who are not yet eligible to vote. Duterte later announced that she will write another book, this time about "a friend's betrayal."

== Personal life ==
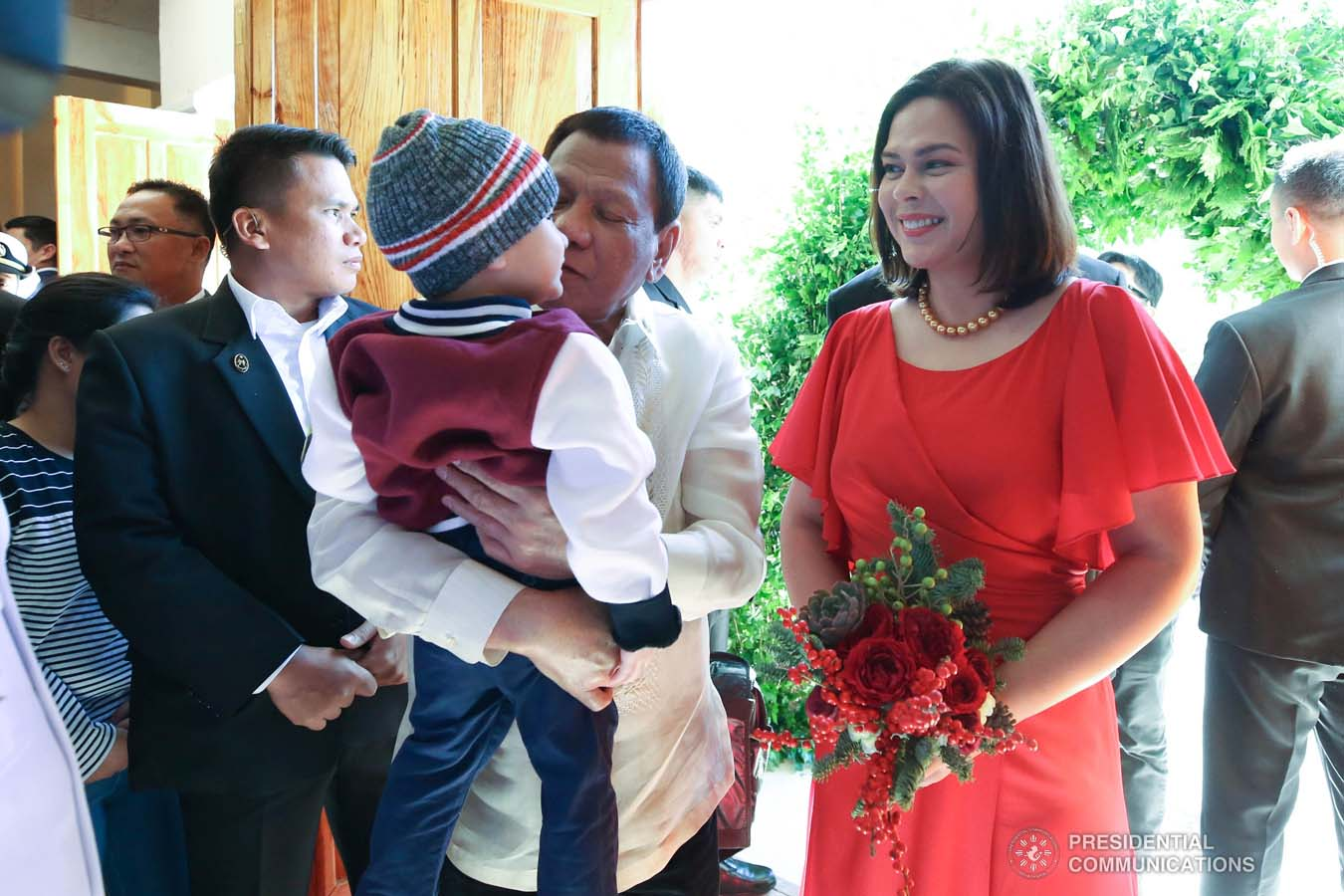
Duterte with her father

Duterte met Manases "Mans" Carpio while she was attending San Beda College (now San Beda University); they married at the Santuario de San Antonio in Forbes Park, Makati, on October 27, 2007. Although news reports have often mentioned that they have three children, Duterte had issued a statement in July 2024 mentioning that they have four children. Manases, a nephew of Ombudsman Conchita Carpio-Morales and Supreme Court Senior Associate Justice Antonio Carpio, is a legal counsel for Lapanday Foods Corporation.

She previously hosted television programs like Una Ka BAI and Byaheng DO30 on GMA Davao, a local station of GMA Network. Byaheng DO30 also expanded its airing across Mindanao on GMA Regional TV and internationally via GMA News TV International. Duterte is also a fan of Korean dramas. In 2017, she stated that her only talent was in writing.

During her political hiatus from 2013 to 2016, Duterte devoted her time as one of the partner lawyers of Carpio & Duterte Lawyers. Planning to join the judiciary, she also passed the Pre-Judicature Program of the Philippine Judicial Academy. Duterte was elected as one of the governors of the Philippine Red Cross in 2014. Duterte is a reserve officer in the Armed Forces of the Philippines with the rank of colonel, being confirmed on March 11, 2020.

In October 2015, to convince her father to run for president in the 2016 Philippine presidential elections despite his reluctance due to lack of campaign funds and political machinery, she shaved her head. On April 18, 2016, in connection with the rape remark made by her father Rodrigo on one of his presidential candidacy campaigns, Duterte took to her Instagram account to admit that she was once a rape victim. However, Rodrigo Duterte dismissed his daughter's admission and referred to her as a "drama queen".

On March 10, 2022, she told supporters at a meet-and-greet that she was part of the LGBT community, with her gender expression being male. Duterte's statement was met with some skepticism by the left-wing LGBT rights group Bahaghari Philippines.

In September 2022, Duterte received criticism for allegations that she was using the official presidential helicopter, a Bell 412, for personal trips to visit her children in Davao. These allegations surfaced after Duterte thanked President Marcos and the 250th Presidential Airlift Wing in a Facebook post for ensuring that she could be at home in time with her children "wherever she may be found in the country". The Philippine Air Force clarified that the Vice President is authorized to use helicopters from the 250th for official functions, denying rumors that Duterte used the helicopter to visit her children in Davao.

On June 12, 2024, a neck scar was first noticed on Duterte while she was in Davao City attending its Independence Day flag-raising ceremony, which she later claimed as coming from an attempted knife attack ("gurgur") against her. When reporters asked for clarification, she stated that her answer was "very straightforward" and added in jest that the attack was done by "all of those people" ("Silang lahat").

== Electoral history ==
Electoral history of Sara Duterte
Year	Office	Party	Votes received				Result
Year	Office	Party	Total	%	P.	Swing	Result
2007	Vice Mayor of Davao City	PDP–Laban	338,095	88.90%	1st	—N/a	Won
2010	Mayor of Davao City	PDP–Laban	388,465	—N/a	1st	—N/a	Won
2016	Mayor of Davao City	HTL	576,230	—N/a	1st	—N/a	Won
2019	Mayor of Davao City	HNP	580,440	—N/a	1st	—N/a	Won
2022	Vice President of the Philippines	Lakas	32,208,417	61.53%	1st	—N/a	Won

== See also ==
- Hoya indaysarae, a species of plant named after her
- Dutertismo
- Political positions of Sara Duterte

== Notes ==
Political offices
Preceded by Luis Bonguyan	Vice Mayor of Davao City; 2007–2010	Succeeded by Rodrigo Duterte
Preceded by Rodrigo Duterte	Mayor of Davao City; 2010–2013	Succeeded by Rodrigo Duterte
Preceded by Rodrigo Duterte	Mayor of Davao City; 2016–2022	Succeeded by Sebastian Duterte
Preceded by Leni Robredo	Vice President of the Philippines; 2022–present	Incumbent
Preceded by Leonor Briones	Secretary of Education; 2022–2024	Succeeded by Sonny Angara
New title	Co-Vice Chair of the National Task Force to End Local Communist Armed Conflict; 2023–2024; Served alongside: Eduardo Año	Vacant
Order of precedence
Preceded by Bongbong Marcos as President	Order of Precedence of the Philippines as Vice President	Succeeded by Joseph Estrada as Former President
Lines of succession
First	Philippine presidential line of succession as Vice President	Succeeded by Win Gatchalian as President of the Senate of the Philippines
Positions in intergovernmental organisations
Preceded by Chan Chun Sing	President of the Southeast Asian Ministers of Education Organization; 2023–2024	Succeeded by Sonny Angara
Party political offices
New political party	Chairperson of Hugpong ng Pagbabago; 2018–2021; 2021–present	Incumbent
Preceded by Bong Revilla	Chairperson of Lakas–CMD; 2021–2023	Succeeded by Bong Revilla
Vacant Title last held by Edu Manzano	Lakas–CMD nominee for Vice President of the Philippines; 2022	Most recent
