= List of Philippine flags =

Government, military and historic flags of the Philippines

This is a list of flags used in the Philippines.

== National flag ==
Flag	Date	Use	Description
	1998–present	National flag of the Philippines	A horizontal bicolor of equal bands of blue and red, with a white equilateral triangle based at the hoist. Within the triangle are three five-pointed stars (fixed on each of the vertices), and a sun with eight major rays (set near the center), all in yellow. The Flag and Heraldic Code of the Philippines (Republic Act. 8491, s. 1998) specifies the color for the blue field as Cable No. 80173; the white field, Cable No. 80001; the red field, Cable No. 80108; and the golden-yellow stars and sun, Cable No. 80068. The colors were introduced in the same year that the Centennial celebrations were to take place.
	1998–present	National flag of the Philippines	The vertical presentation places the white triangle at the top, the blue band to the left, and the red band to the right.

== Governmental flags ==
=== Executive branch ===
Flag	Date	Use	Description
	2004–present	Flag of the president of the Philippines	The coat of arms of the president of the Philippines against a blue field. The number of stars correspond to the number of provinces (currently 82).
	2004–present	Flag of the vice president of the Philippines	The coat of arms of the vice president of the Philippines against a white field.

=== Legislative branch ===
Flag	Date	Use	Description
	2001–present	Flag of the Senate	The seal of the Senate against a red field.
	2015–present	Flag of the House of Representatives	The seal of the House of Representatives against a yellow field.

=== Judicial branch ===
Flag	Date	Use	Description
	1946	Flag of the Supreme Court	The seal of the Supreme Court against a purple field.
	1978	Flag of the Sandiganbayan	The seal of the Sandiganbayan against a maroon field.
	1946	Flag of the Court of Appeals	The seal of the Court of Appeals against an olive green field.
		Flag of the Court of Tax Appeals	The seal of the Court of Tax Appeals against a sky blue field.

=== Other government offices ===
Flag	Date	Use	Description
		Customs ensign	Navy blue and white vertical bands with a white canton bearing a gold sea-lion bearing a sword.
		Flag of the Metropolitan Manila Development Authority	Seal of the MMDA on a white field.
		Flag of the DPWH-ARMM / Ministry of Public Works of Bangsamoro	Seal of the regional office/ministry on a sky blue field.

=== Executive departments ===
Flag	Date	Use	Description
	1987	Flag of the Department of Health	The seal of the Department of Health against a yellow field.
	1987	Flag of the Department of Science and Technology	The logo of the Department of Science and Technology against a white field.
	1986	Flag of the Department of Tourism	A horizontal triband of yellow (top and bottom) and white with the seal of the Department of Tourism centered on the white band.
	1987	Flag of the Department of Finance	The seal of the Department of Finance against a violet field.
	1987	Flag of the Department of Agriculture	The logo of the Department of Agriculture with the department's name in both Tagalog and English in Times New Roman against a white field.
	2022	Flag of the Department of Migrant Workers	The coat of arms of the Philippines with the department's name in blackletter text against a white field.

== Military flags ==
Flag	Date	Use	Description
	1998–present (only during a state of war)	State and war flag	The national flag, hoisted with red and blue fields inverted, unique among the national flags.
		Naval ensign and jack	Eight-rayed golden sun and three stars of the national flag on an azure field.
	2005–present	Flag of the Philippine Armed Forces	Coat of arms of the Armed Forces of the Philippines on a triband field that consists the color: blue, navy blue, and army green that represents the three main branches of the Philippine Armed Forces.
	2005–present	Flag of the Philippine Army	Seal of the Philippine Army on a dark green field.
	2002–present	Flag of the Philippine Navy	Seal of the Philippine Navy on a dark blue field.
	2005–present	Flag of the Philippine Air Force	Seal of the Philippine Air Force on a blue field.
	2004–present	Flag of the Philippine Marine Corps	Coat of arms of the Philippine Marine Corps on a blue field, flanked by ribbons bearing the organization's name in English and motto in Tagalog.

=== Rank flags ===
Flag	Date	Use	Description
	?–present	Flag of the Chairman of the Joint Chiefs of Armed Forces of the Philippines	Horizontal tricolor of air force blue, navy blue, and green, with the seal of the AFP in the upper hoist and four white stars in the navy blue band.
	?–present	Flag of the Vice Chairman of the Joint Chiefs of Armed Forces of the Philippines	Horizontal tricolor of air force blue, navy blue, and green, with the seal of the AFP in the upper hoist and three white stars in the navy blue band.
	?–present	Flag of General of the Philippine Army	Green field with four white stars.
	?–present	Flag of Lieutenant General of the Philippine Army	Green field with three white stars.
	?–present	Flag of Major General of the Philippine Army	Green field with two white stars.
	?–present	Flag of Brigadier General of the Philippine Army	Green field with one white star.
	?–present	Flag of Admiral of the Philippine Navy	Blue field with four white stars.
	?–present	Flag of Vice Admiral of the Philippine Navy	Blue field with three white stars.
	?–present	Flag of Rear Admiral of the Philippine Navy	Blue field with two white stars.
	?–present	Flag of Commodore of the Philippine Navy	Blue field with one white star.
	?–present	Flag of General of the Philippine Air Force	Light blue field with four white stars.
	?–present	Flag of Lieutenant General of the Philippine Air Force	Light blue field with three white stars.
	?–present	Flag of Major General of the Philippine Air Force	Light blue field with two white stars.
	?–present	Flag of Brigadier General of the Philippine Air Force	Light blue field with one white stars.
	?–present	Flag of General of the Philippine Marine Corps	Red field with four white stars.
	?–present	Flag of Lieutenant General of the Philippine Marine Corps	Red field with three white stars.
	?–present	Flag of Major General of the Philippine Marine Corps	Red field with two white stars.
	?–present	Flag of Brigadier General of the Philippine Marine Corps	Red field with one white star.

== Philippine Coast Guard flags ==
Flag	Date	Use	Description
	1998–present	Flag of the Philippine Coast Guard	Seal of the Philippine Coast Guard on a dark blue field.

== Civil flags ==
Flag	Date	Use	Description
	1903–present	Coastwise Emblem of the Philippines	White flag with a blue and red star on the horizontal median line.

== Regional flags ==
Among the country's eighteen regions, only the Bangsamoro Autonomous Region in Muslim Mindanao (BARMM) has its own officially legislated regional flag. In the past, the Autonomous Region in Muslim Mindanao (ARMM) also had its own officially legislated regional flag. The purported flag of the Cordillera Administrative Region — which has no elected regional government that could legally specify the details of the reported emblem — has not been attested.

Flag	Date	Use	Description
	1992–2019	Regional flag of the Autonomous Region in Muslim Mindanao	A horizontal tricolor of equal stripes of blue (top), white (middle), and red (bottom). The top stripe bears near the hoist one yellow five-pointed star; the middle stripe's center, a green disc filled with yellow elements — a tilted crescent moon nearly enclosing four smaller five-pointed stars; the bottom stripe, a silver kris. The number of smaller stars, meant to represent the number of the region's constituent provinces, has de facto varied from four (1992–2001), to five (2001–2006), to six (2006–2008) to five again (2006–2019), but because the flag specifications contained within the 1992 law (Muslim Mindanao Autonomy Act No. 12) were not amended the original flag remained the only de jure official design.
	1992–2019	Regional flag of the Autonomous Region in Muslim Mindanao	The vertical presentation places the yellow star in the top left corner and the red stripe at the right with the blade of the kris pointing down.
	2019–present	Regional flag of the Bangsamoro Autonomous Region in Muslim Mindanao	A horizontal tricolor of equal stripes of green (top), white (middle), and red (bottom). Charged in the center of the middle stripe is a yellow crescent moon enclosing a seven-pointed star. In the bottom stripe, a white kris with the blade pointing towards the fly.
	2019–present	Regional flag of the Bangsamoro Autonomous Region in Muslim Mindanao	The vertical presentation places the red stripe at the right with the blade of the kris pointing down.
	1988–1995	Purported flag of the Cordillera Administrative Region	A horizontal bicolor of green (top) and yellow (bottom), centered upon which is a charge consisting of a Cordillera warrior shield bearing the CAR Regional Development Council (RDC) logo adopted in 1988, when Kalinga–Apayao was still a single province.

== Municipal and city flags ==
Like the flags of most Philippine provinces, flags of cities and municipalities usually just bear the seal of the municipality or city on a single or multi colored field, but there are some municipal or city flags that differ from the standard. All municipalities in the province of Camarines Norte and Aklan bear flags that differ from the standard.

Flag	Date	Use	Description
		Flag of Balilihan, Bohol	A vertical tricolor of sky blue, white, and red, heavily inspired by the provincial flag of Bohol. Centered on the middle white stripe is the municipal seal, which includes a yellow carabao head, a historic belfry, two palm trees, and dark green laurel leaves.
		Flag of Garcia Hernandez, Bohol	A vertical bicolor of blue and white, a scene with a white dove at the center with a border made of four arms holding each other, itself wreathed in two branches having thirty leaves in total.
	2003–present	Flag of Kalilangan, Bukidnon	Green and blue horizontal stripes with a vertical white band at the hoist bearing a sun surrounded by fourteen stars. Adopted on June 9, 2003 through Municipal Council Resolution No. 2003-315.
Link to file		Flag of Maribojoc, Bohol	Vertical tricolor of green, white, and blue, with a sun in the middle bearing the silhouette of a church.
		Flag of San Mateo, Rizal	Vertical triband of sky blue, white (double width), and sky blue, with the eight-rayed sun of the flag of the Philippines and a palm frond in the white band.
		Flag of Bustos, Bulacan	A green field adorned with a radiant yellow sun with fourteen rays. The bottom of the flag features a curved arch composed of three colored stripes: yellow, green, and white.
	1995–present	Flag of Cavite City	A 3:5 ratio horizontal triband of red, green, and red, featuring a distinctive emblem on the hoist (canton) side.
		Flag of Mandaluyong	A horizontal bicolor of yellow and red, with the city seal of Mandaluyong in the yellow upper stripe.

== Political flags ==
Flag	Date	Use	Description
Current
	2012–present	Flag of the Maute Group, Khalifa Islamiyah Mindanao and Ansar Khalifa Philippines	The flag of Islamic State
	2008–present	Flag of the Bangsamoro Islamic Freedom Fighters	The flag of Islamic State
	2001–present	Flag of the MNLF Executive Council of 15	
	1996–present	Flag of the Moro National Liberation Front	
	1977–present	Flag of the Moro Islamic Liberation Front	
	1973–present	Flag of the National Democratic Front of the Philippines	
	1995–present	Flag of the Revolutionary Workers' Party	
	1969–present	Flag of the New People's Army	
	1968–present	Flags of the Communist Party of the Philippines	
Former
	1986 and 1990	Proposed flags of the Federal Republic of Mindanao	
	1986–2011	Flags of the Cordillera People's Liberation Army	
	1968–1969	Flag of the Muslim Independence Movement	
	1942–1945	Flag of the KALIBAPI	Red background with a white disc in the center containing the letter K.
	1942–1954	Flag of the Hukbalahap	
	1941–1945	Flag of the Wha-Chi	A red field. Upper-hoist corner: Three yellow stars representing the guerrilla unit's codes of conduct Near the center: Large Chinese text reading "華支" (Wha-Chi). Lower-fly corner: Two yellow horizontal bars representing their two core wartime goals: defeating Japanese imperialism and defending democratic freedom.
	1936–1945	Flag of the Philippine Falange	

== Flag proposals ==
Flag	Date proposed	Use	Description
	1901	National flag	Mark Twain's satirical proposal.
	1998, 2008	National flag	Ninth ray for the flag's sun
	2014	National flag	Emmanuel L. Osorio's proposal. Addition of a ninth ray to represent the Muslim and indigenous people and a fourth star for Sabah.

== Historic areas ==
=== Republics ===
Flag	Date	Use	Description
	1898–1901	Flag of the Republic of Negros	A horizontal bicolor of royal blue and crimson red with a white equilateral triangle at the hoist, featuring round-tipped sun rays. It visually mirrors the national standard but holds deep regional significance.
	1902–1906	Flag of the Tagalog Republic	General Macario Sakay’s Tagalog Republic flag featured a red field emblazoned with a white sun.

=== Provinces ===
Flag	Date	Use	Description
	1845–1898	Provincial ensign of the province of Manila	White and red horizontal bicolor with a swallow-tail fly.
	1886–1898	Provincial ensign of Iloilo	White and blue horizontal bicolor with a swallow-tail fly.

== Historical flags ==
=== National flags ===
Flag	Date	Use	Description
The Spanish East Indies (1565–1898)
	1565–1762; 1764–1821	Flag used when the Philippine Islands were a part of New Spain.	The Cross of Burgundy: a red saltire resembling two crossed, roughly-pruned branches, on a white field.
	1762–1764	Flag during the British occupation of the Philippines, as used in occupied Manila and Cavite.	The flag of the British East India Company before 1810: A flag with red and white stripes with the Kingdom of Great Britain's Union Flag as a canton. The Union flag bears red cross on a white field, commonly called St George's Cross, superimposed on a white saltire on a blue field, known as St Andrew's Cross. Also known as the "King's Colours".
	1821–1873	Used during Spanish East Indies period.	Three horizontal stripes of red, weld-yellow, and red, the center stripe being twice as wide as each red stripe with the coat of arms shifted towards the hoist within the weld-yellow stripe. The arms are crowned and vertically divided, the left red field with a tower representing Castille, the right white field with a lion representing León.
	1873–1874	Used by the Spanish East Indies under the First Spanish Republic.	Three horizontal stripes of red, weld-yellow, and red, the yellow stripe being twice as wide as each red stripe with the coat of arms shifted towards the hoist within the yellow stripe. Royal crown removed from arms.
	1874–1898	Used during Spanish East Indies after the restoration of the Spanish monarchy.	The flag of the Kingdom of Spain used prior to the First Spanish Republic was reinstated.
Philippine Revolution – First Philippine Republic
	1898–1901	The flag design was conceived by President Emilio Aguinaldo. The exact shade of blue is debated; many variants were used by subsequent governments.	Sewn by Marcela Marino de Agoncillo, Lorenza Agoncillo, and Delfina Herbosa de Natividad in Hong Kong and first flown in battle on May 28, 1898. It was formally unfurled during the Proclamation of Philippine Independence and the flag of the First Philippine Republic, on June 12, 1898 by President Aguinaldo. It contains a mythical sun (with a face) similar to the Sun of May in other former Spanish colonies; the triangle of Freemasonry; the eight rays representing eight rebellious provinces of the Philippines first placed under martial law by the Governor-General. Some flags carry the Spanish texts: Fuerzas Expedicionarias del Norte de Luzon on its obverse and Libertad Justicia e Ygualdad on its reverse, which means "Northern Luzon Expeditionary Forces" and "Liberty, Justice, and Equality" respectively.
American and Commonwealth period (1898–1946)
	1898–1908	Used while under direct administration from the United States of America.	The Philippine Commission, passed Act No. 1697 or the Flag Law of 1907, which outlawed the display of the Philippine flag and replaced the country's flag to the stars and stripes of the United States of America. The same law prohibited the playing of the national anthem. Thirteen horizontal stripes of alternating red and white representing the original Thirteen Colonies; in the canton, white stars on a blue field, the number of stars increased as the United States expanded its territory.
	1908–1912	Variant after Oklahoma became a state	The Philippine Commission, passed Act No. 1697 or the Flag Law of 1907, which outlawed the display of the Philippine flag and replaced the country's flag to the stars and stripes of the United States of America. The same law prohibited the playing of the national anthem. Thirteen horizontal stripes of alternating red and white representing the original Thirteen Colonies; in the canton, white stars on a blue field, the number of stars increased as the United States expanded its territory.
	1912–1919	Variant after Arizona and New Mexico achieved statehood	The Philippine Commission, passed Act No. 1697 or the Flag Law of 1907, which outlawed the display of the Philippine flag and replaced the country's flag to the stars and stripes of the United States of America. The same law prohibited the playing of the national anthem. Thirteen horizontal stripes of alternating red and white representing the original Thirteen Colonies; in the canton, white stars on a blue field, the number of stars increased as the United States expanded its territory.
	1919–1936	From October 30, 1919, two flags were flown in the Philippines: the American flag and the flag conceived by Emilio Aguinaldo which was made the national flag of the Philippines with the repealing of Act No. 1697.	The American flag remained unchanged since 1919. For the Philippine flag, the design conceived by Emilio Aguinaldo remained but the shades of blue and red were adopted from the American flag. The sun's face was removed, but its stylized rays were retained. There existed many versions of the flag as no official design had been codified.
	1936–1946	Used during the Commonwealth period, President Manuel L. Quezon issued Executive Order No. 23 on March 25, 1936, which officially standardized the design, technical specifications, and geometry of the Philippine flag.	Specifications standardized; Defined under Executive Order No. 23, s. 1936 which was signed on March 25, 1936. The de facto shade of blue used was Cable No. 70077 or "National Flag Blue" by the Reference Guide of the Textile Color Card Association of the United States. The triangle was made equilateral and the sun's rays were also further simplified, achieving its present form. Also used by the Commonwealth government-in-exile from 1942 to 1945.
Japanese period (1942–1945)
	1942–1943	Used during the Japanese Occupation.	The Japanese flag as it appeared until 1999: a red sun-disc, shifted 1% towards the hoist of center, on a white field.
	1943–1945	Used during the Second Republic.	Emilio Aguinaldo's flag was hoisted upon proclamation of the Second Republic. However, the design as used by the Commonwealth remained.
	13 December 1943 (de facto)	Used during the inauguration of the Second Republic.	The original specifications of the flag as used by the Commonwealth government was readopted pursuant to Executive Order 17 issued on December 13, 1943.
	1943–1945 (only during a state of war)	State and war flag	The national flag, hoisted with red and blue fields inverted, unique among the national flags.
Sovereignty (1946–present)
	1946–1985	Following independence, the 1936 design specifications standardized by President Manuel L. Quezon sported a shade of blue currently called National Flag Blue. Initially having de facto standing, it was officially adopted in 1955. In 1985, the shade of blue was updated to Oriental Blue, this change would later be rescinded in favor of pre-1985 National Flag Blue. In 1998, the flag gained its present definitive shade of blue currently called Royal Blue.	Defined under Executive Order No. 23, s. 1936 dated March 25, 1936. The shade of blue used here is Cable No. 70077 or "National Flag Blue" by the Reference Guide of the Textile Color Card Association of the United States. The particular shade of blue had de facto standing until January 24, 1955, when President Ramón Magsaysay upon the recommendation of the Philippine Heraldry Committee (PHC) officially adopted Cable No. 70077 or "National Flag Blue" as the official shade of blue to be used.
	1985–1986	Following independence, the 1936 design specifications standardized by President Manuel L. Quezon sported a shade of blue currently called National Flag Blue. Initially having de facto standing, it was officially adopted in 1955. In 1985, the shade of blue was updated to Oriental Blue, this change would later be rescinded in favor of pre-1985 National Flag Blue. In 1998, the flag gained its present definitive shade of blue currently called Royal Blue.	Executive Order No. 1010, s. 1985 was issued by President Ferdinand E. Marcos on February 25, 1985 instructing the National Historical Institute (NHI) "to restore the original color of the First Philippine Flag" amidst debate on the shade used in the original flag. The executive order declared that "the shade of the color blue was lighter than the present dark blue". The executive order did not specify a shade of blue to be adopted. A de facto version of the flag which featured a light blue was used in April 1985 despite NHI not having announced its recommendation. The NHI in May 1985, adopted Cable No. 80176 or "Oriental Blue" for the new national flag.
	1986–1998	Following independence, the 1936 design specifications standardized by President Manuel L. Quezon sported a shade of blue currently called National Flag Blue. Initially having de facto standing, it was officially adopted in 1955. In 1985, the shade of blue was updated to Oriental Blue, this change would later be rescinded in favor of pre-1985 National Flag Blue. In 1998, the flag gained its present definitive shade of blue currently called Royal Blue.	1936 version of the flag restored after the 1986 People Power Revolution. President Corazon C. Aquino restored the pre-1985 National Flag Blue specifications of the flag through Executive Order No. 292, s. 1987 which was signed on July 25, 1987.
	1936–1985; 1986–1998 (only during a state of war)	State and war flag	The national flag, hoisted with red and blue fields inverted, unique among the national flags.

=== Governmental flags ===
Flag	Date	Use	Description
Executive branch
	1935–1946	Flag of the president of the Philippines	The coat of arms of the Philippine Commonwealth against a blue field with four golden stars on each corner.
	1946–1947	Flag of the president of the Philippines	The coat of arms of the Philippines against a blue field with four golden stars on each corner.
	1947–1951	Flag of the president of the Philippines	The presidential arms (minus the circle of stars) against a blue field with four golden stars on each corner.
	1951–1979	Flag of the president of the Philippines	The 1948 design, with the four golden stars replaced by a ring of golden stars. The number of stars theoretically changed as the number of provinces changed.
	1981–1986	Flag of the president of the Philippines	The flag's shade became a lighter blue, and the red triangle was inverted. The sea-lion was replaced by a golden eagle, bearing three branches and arrows, and the ring of stars were changed to white.
	1986–2004	Flag of the president of the Philippines	The coat of arms of the president of the Philippines with white as the color of the stars against a light blue field.
	1986–2004	Flag of the vice president of the Philippines	The former vice presidential seal against a white field.
	1981–1986	Flag of the prime minister of the Philippines	The seal of the prime minister against a yellow field.

=== Revolutionary flags ===
Flag	Date	Use	Description
	1762–1763	Flag of the Palaris Revolt	"...it was two "varas" long and a trifle more narrow; at each corner it had a two-headed eagle, and in the center an escutcheon with its border, and within it the Arms of the Dominican Order..."
	1807	Flags of the Basi Revolt	
	1872	Flag of the Cavite Mutiny	Bicolor of white over red.
	1898	Flag of the Negros Revolution	

== See also ==
- Flag of the Philippines
- Coat of arms of the Philippines
- Flags of the Philippine provinces
- Flags of the Philippine Revolution
  - Evolution of the Philippine Flag
