= Seal of Manila =

Circle containing the coat of arms of the Philippine capital

- The Seal of Manila
- Armiger: City of Manila
- Adopted: 1970 (Present seal)
- Earlier version: 1950, 1965, 2014
- Use: To represent Manila and the City Government, and as a seal of approval to authenticate certain documents and local government legislation.

The Seal of Manila (Filipino: Sagisag ng Maynila) is composed of the city's modern coat-of-arms, with colors mirroring those of the Philippine National Flag. It is a modified form of the city's historical arms bestowed in the 16th century.

The arms of the seal consist of a pre-Hispanic shield, horizontally divided into red and blue fields. The top, red half depicts the city's nickname, "Pearl of the Orient", while the lower, blue half is charged with a sea-lion surmounting the waves of the River Pasig and Manila Bay. The sea-lion originally represented the islands' former colonial status as an ultramar (overseas) possession of Spain, and is ultimately derived from the arms of the Kingdom of León.

A white roundel surrounds the arms containing the words Lungsod ng Maynila and Pilipinas (Filipino, "City of Manila"; "Philippines") in Helvetica font (said font officially in use since 2019) and six yellow stars representing the city's six congressional districts.

== Historical arms ==
A depiction of the original arms

First version of the seal designed by the Philippine Heraldry Committee, 1950

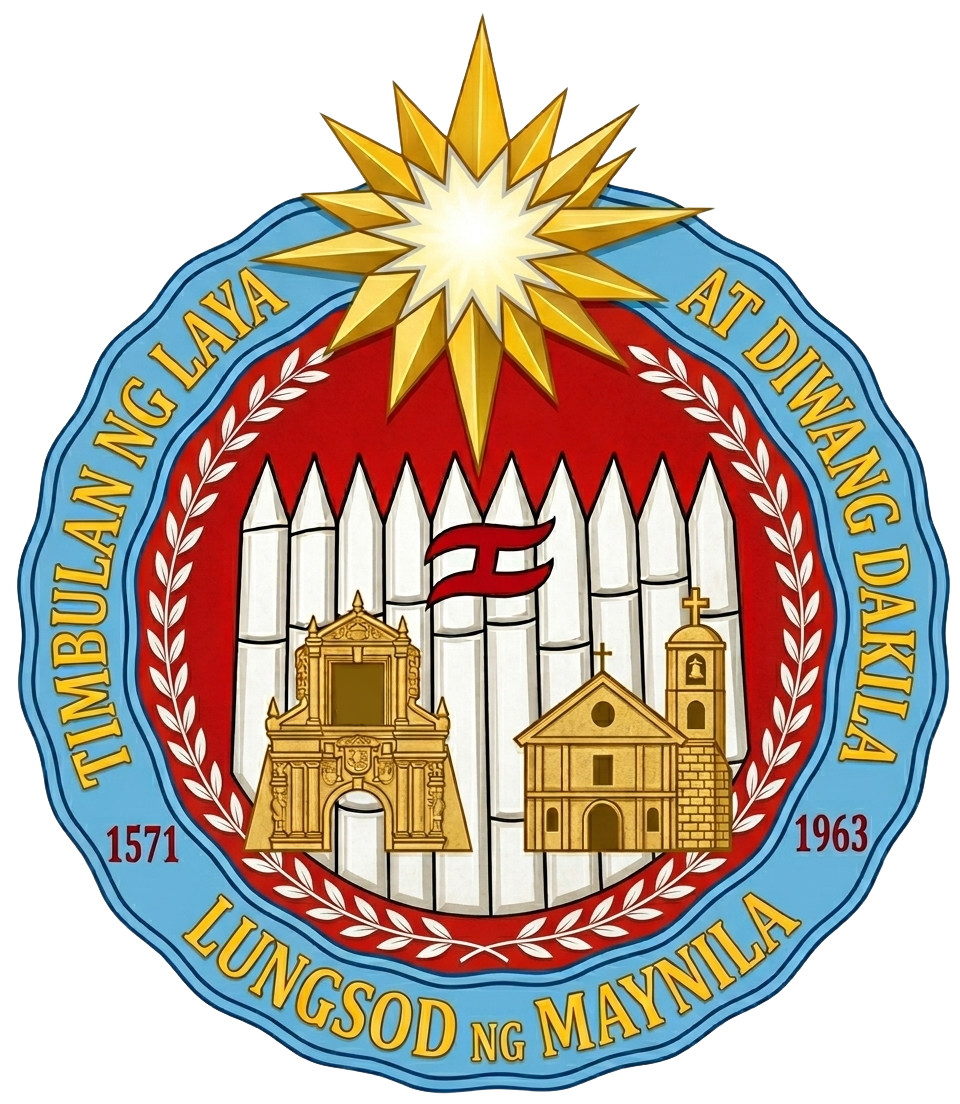
Seal of Manila adopted in 1965 during the term of Mayor Antonio Villegas. The seal was used until the 1970s and is the basis of the official arms of the Manila Police District.

For easier identification of the city, Manila was granted a coat of arms by a decree issued on 20 March 1596 by King Philip II of Spain. The grant was as follows:

Don Philipe, by the grace of God, etc.

Inasmuch as you, Captain Agustin de Arce, in the capacity of procurador-general of the Filipinas Islands, have informed me that the inhabitants of the city of Manila did render me service in its discovery, and remain there continuing this work; and inasmuch as you have entreated me–in consideration of the said facts, and because the said city of Manila is the capital and principal city of the said islands, and it was therefore commanded that an audiencia be again established there, and its cathedral church elevated into a metropolitan church, by which the city will be ennobled–that I should order a coat-of-arms to be bestowed upon the city, such as is possessed by other cities of the Indias; and considering that my council on the affairs of the Indias, after consultation with me, has favored the above request; it has seemed to me fitting to grant it. By these presents I assign, as the special coat-of-arms of the said city of Manila in the Filipinas Islands, a shield which shall have in the center of its upper part a golden castle on a red field, closed by a blue door and windows, and which shall be surmounted by a crown; and in the lower half on a blue field a half lion and half dolphin of silver, armed and langued gules–that is to say, with red nails and tongue. The said lion shall hold in his paw a sword with guard and hilt. This coat-of-arms shall be made similar to the accompanying shield, painted as is indicated above.

I bestow these arms upon the said city of Manila, as its own, and as its appointed and recognized device, so that it may and shall bear and place them upon its banners, shields, seals, flags, and standards, and in all other parts and places desired and considered fitting, according to, and following the same form and manner as the other cities of my kingdoms to which I have given arms and device place and possess them. And by this my decree, I charge the most serene prince, Don Philipo, my very dear and well beloved son, and the kings succeeding to me, and I order the infants, prelates, dukes, marqueses, counts, and grandees; the masters, priors, commanders and sub-commanders of the orders; the governors of castles, forts, and open districts; the members of my council, and the president and auditors of the same royal audiencias; the alcaldes, constables of my house, court, and chanceries; all the councils, corregidors, asistentes, governors, veinte e cuatros, regidors, and jurors; and the knights, squires, officials, and freemen of all the cities, towns, and villages of these my kingdoms and seigniories, and of my said Indias, islands, and Tierra Firme of the Ocean Sea–both in the present and future, and each and every one of them in his jurisdiction, who shall be notified of this–that they observe and regard, and cause to be observed and regarded the said grant of the said arms which I thus bestow upon the said city of Manila in the Filipinas Islands, so that they be allowed to place and possess them in the said city. And I order that no obstruction or impediment be offered to this concession or to any part of it, and that no one shall consent to place any obstruction whatever thereto, under penalty of my displeasure, and of a fine of ten thousand maravedis, to be paid to my exchequer, laid upon any person who shall act contrary to this order. Given in Aranxuez, on the twentieth day of March, one thousand five hundred and ninety-six.

Yo el Rey

— English translation by Frederic W. Morrison. From Blair and Robertson's "The Philippine Islands, 1493-1898"

In the 19th century, King Ferdinand VII granted the use and placement of the royal crown above the castle itself as an augmentation of honour by royal cedula of April 23, 1826.

These arms were used since its introduction in 1596 well up to the mid-20th century. While the coat of arms evolved throughout the centuries, adopting different forms and minor changes, its basic elements remained much the same–a castle on red and a sea-lion on blue.

In 1965, Mayor Antonio Villegas introduced a new seal for Manila which featured the palisades of the fort of Rajah Sulayman, the baybayin character for "ka", and the San Agustin Church and the Fort Santiago gate. The motto, in gold was Timbulan ng Laya at Diwang Dakila (English:Buoy of Liberty and a Great Spirit). In the 1970s, the seal was replaced by another design by Galo Ocampo. The symbol like the older iterations featured a sea-lion but did not depict a castle. Ocampo introduced the pearl and seashell element to the seal. Journalist Ambeth R. Ocampo also once mentioned how Singapore's Merlion was a plagiarism by Singaporeans of Manila's Coat of Arms. Ocampo having accused Singapore of cultural appropriation.Furthermore, the terms "Mer" and "Lion" are Latin words, belonging to the same Romance languages sub-family both Spanish and Latin descend from, of which, the Philippines, was colonized by a nation speaking a Romance language, Spain. Whereas the word "sea-lion" is an Anglophone Germanic term, more apt for Singapore, being colonized by a nation speaking a Germanic language, England. Ascribing the term "Merlion" (Romance language in origin) to a symbol used by a country colonized by Germanic English speakers, Singapore, while ascribing the term "Sea-Lion" (Germanic language in roots) to Romance speakers, that created, the Seal of Manila, is linguistically incompatible.

== Derivatives ==
Arms of Manila as an inescutcheon on the coat of arms of the Philippine Commonwealth (right)

When the Americans established the Insular Government after gaining control of the Philippines, they introduced a coat of arms for the whole Philippine Islands whereby the arms of Manila were an inescutcheon on a shield featuring the colors and stripes representing the United States. Later in 1935, the Commonwealth of the Philippines adapted the Insular Government's arms where, again, the coat of arms of Manila were an inescutcheon but this time, over a shield featuring the colors of the Philippine flag–red, white, and blue; in addition to the three stars added to its chief. However, the colors of the arms of Manila in the coat of arms of the Commonwealth had been altered in color. Instead of the castle having its door and windows in blue, they were made argent. The sea-lion in the lower field was made gold and it now was charged on an argent background. The coat of arms of the Commonwealth was briefly changed in 1942 when the arms of Manila were replaced with a Philippine sun charged on an argent oval. The new coat of arms was abandoned and the 1935 arms were restored and remained in use until the establishment of the Republic in 1946.

While the original 1596 arms has, since the mid-20th century, fallen out of use. The current coat of arms of the Archdiocese of Manila still retains much of what constituted the original arms, albeit modified to include religious elements.

== Current usage ==
Flag of the City of Manila featuring the seal on a plain green background.

The sea-lion in the original coat of arms of Manila, now more commonly depicted in gold than silver, was eventually utilized in many other symbols of state in the Philippines such as the seal of the president of the Philippines. It is also a symbol used in many different government departments and organizations such as the Philippine Navy, Department of Education, Department of Finance, Department of Budget and Management, etc. It also features prominently on the insignias of medals and the like such as the Philippine Legion of Honor and the Order of Sikatuna.

=== Symbolism ===
The official website of the city government of Manila mentions the symbolism behind specific elements of the seal.

Seal of Manila.	Element	Represents
Seal of Manila.	Shield	It is stated to "carry the nation's colors". It represents the "valor, the blood and the idealism" of Manila's forces which fought against invasion.
Seal of Manila.	Circular band	the band around the seal declares the holder of the seal to be the city of Manila.
Seal of Manila.	Stars	The six stars represents the six legislative districts of Manila which is placed on the circular band.
Seal of Manila.	Pearl and shell	Signifies the identity of Manila as a city "that has transformed to hundred divergent cultures collected over the centuries from nationalities who landed on her shore into something essentially Filipino"
Seal of Manila.	Sea-lion	Described to be en garde. Represents City Government's authority.
Seal of Manila.	Waves	The waves of alternating blue and white (azure and argent) signifies the Pasig River. This water feature is described as the most important landmark which had an important role in the early years and development of the city's commerce and industry.
