= Aguinaldo's Breakfast =

Book by Ambeth Ocampo

Rizal Without the Overcoat
- Title page for Aguinaldo's Breakfast & More Looking Back Essays (1993)
- Author: Ambeth Ocampo
- Language: English
- Subject: Emilio Aguinaldo; Philippine history
- Publisher: Anvil Publishing Inc.
- Publication date: 1993
- Publication place: Philippines
- Pages: 232
- ISBN: 9712702812
- OCLC: 246106224

Aguinaldo's Breakfast and More Looking Back Essays is a book by Filipino writer Ambeth Ocampo. It contains his Philippine Daily Globe columns which were not published in his earlier books. It also includes longer pieces that were published in the Weekend Magazine, the Sunday supplement of the now-defunct Philippines Daily Press, and pieces from the Sunday Inquirer Magazine. Written between 1986 and 1989, his essays are collected under four headings: Life in the Spanish Philippines; Food and Other Pleasures, I am Like a Camera: Profiles; and Words, Image and Music. Among the interviews and profiles are those about Teodoro Agoncillo, Dely Atay-atayan, Guillermo Tolentino, Jose Maria Sison, Galo Ocampo and others.
