= Geography of Manila =

The geography of the City of Manila is characterized by its coastal position at the estuary of the Pasig River that flows to Manila Bay. The city is located on a naturally protected harbor, regarded as one of the finest harbors in Asia. The scarce availability of land is a contributing factor that makes Manila the densest populated city in the world.

Almost all of the city sits atop of centuries of prehistoric alluvial deposits built up by the Pasig River and on some land reclaimed from Manila Bay. The city's land has been altered substantially by human intervention, with considerable land reclamation along the waterfronts since the American colonial times. Some of the natural variations in topography have been evened out due to the urbanization of the city. Manila lies 800 miles (1,300 km) from mainland Asia.

Before and during the Spanish colonization of the Philippines, Manila was the provincial capital over a province whose territory at one time covered nearly all of Luzon, and included the modern territorial subdivisions of Pampanga, Bulacan, Rizal, Laguna, Batangas, Quezon, Mindoro, Masbate and Marinduque. Later, these subdivisions were themselves made provinces, leaving Manila province with a territory roughly equal to the present City of Manila proper (except Intramuros, the capital site), and the northwestern two-thirds of Rizal province. The boundary of Manila province went from northeast to southwest, including Antipolo, Cainta, Taytay and Taguig, and all of the towns north and west of them, in Manila province; and Angono, Teresa, Morong, and the towns south and east of them, in Laguna province. Early in the province's history, the provincial name was changed from Manila to Tondo Province, by which it was known for most of the Spanish era.

In about 1853, four pueblos or towns of Tondo Province were joined with the northeastern towns of Laguna province to form the politico-military Distrito de los Montes de San Mateo, or District of the San Mateo Mountains. The Tondo Province annexed to this new district the towns of Cainta, Taytay, Antipolo and Boso-boso, while Laguna contributed the towns of Angono, Binangonan, Cardona, Morong, Baras, Tanay, Pililla and Jalajala. But the name of the new district proved unwieldy, too long, and misled many into thinking the town of San Mateo (in Tondo province) was the capital of the San Mateo Mountain District, when in reality the district capital was in Morong. So, in 1859, following common practice of the day, the district was renamed after its capital; namely, Morong District. At about the same time, Tondo Province was renamed Manila Province.

When the Spaniards turned over the Philippines to the hands of the Americans, a civil government was formed. In about the same period, the Manila Province was dissolved by the Philippine Commission, and its pueblos were incorporated with those of the District of Morong, forming the new Province of Rizal. A few weeks, a new charter for the City of Manila, defining its boundaries and annexing some of towns of the Province of Rizal to its districts. These boundaries were slightly revised and redefined on January 29, 1902, when the suburb of Gagalangin was annexed to the city district of Tondo, and the former pueblo of Santa Ana was turned into a city district of Manila. On July 30 of the same year, the city board officially divided the city into 13 political subdivisions named as districts, and the boundaries of each were defined. On August 15 of the same year, the pueblo of Pandacan was annexed as a city district. Since then the boundaries and city districts of Manila have remained essentially the same.

During World War II, the city of Manila was declared an open city and its administrative boundaries expanded to outlying cities and municipalities. It was called the Greater Manila and included districts such as Bagumbayan means New Town (South of Manila), Bagumpanahon means "New Era" (Sampaloc, Quiapo, San Miguel and Santa Cruz), Bagumbuhay means "New Life" (Tondo), Bagong Diwa means "New Order" (Binondo & San Nicholas), the then newly established Quezon City was collapsed and divided into two districts, while the municipalities of Caloocan, Las Piñas, Malabon, Makati, Mandaluyong, Navotas, Parañaque, Pasay, and San Juan became districts of Manila.

== Rivers and canals ==
=== Pasig River ===
Pasig River is the main river that bisects the city into the north and south. It flows east to west, and it connects Laguna de Bay to Manila Bay.

=== San Juan River ===
San Juan River flows through the northeastern most part of the city at the district of Santa Mesa. It serves as the natural boundary between Manila and the cities of San Juan and Mandaluyong. It is a major tributary of the Pasig River.

== City Plan ==
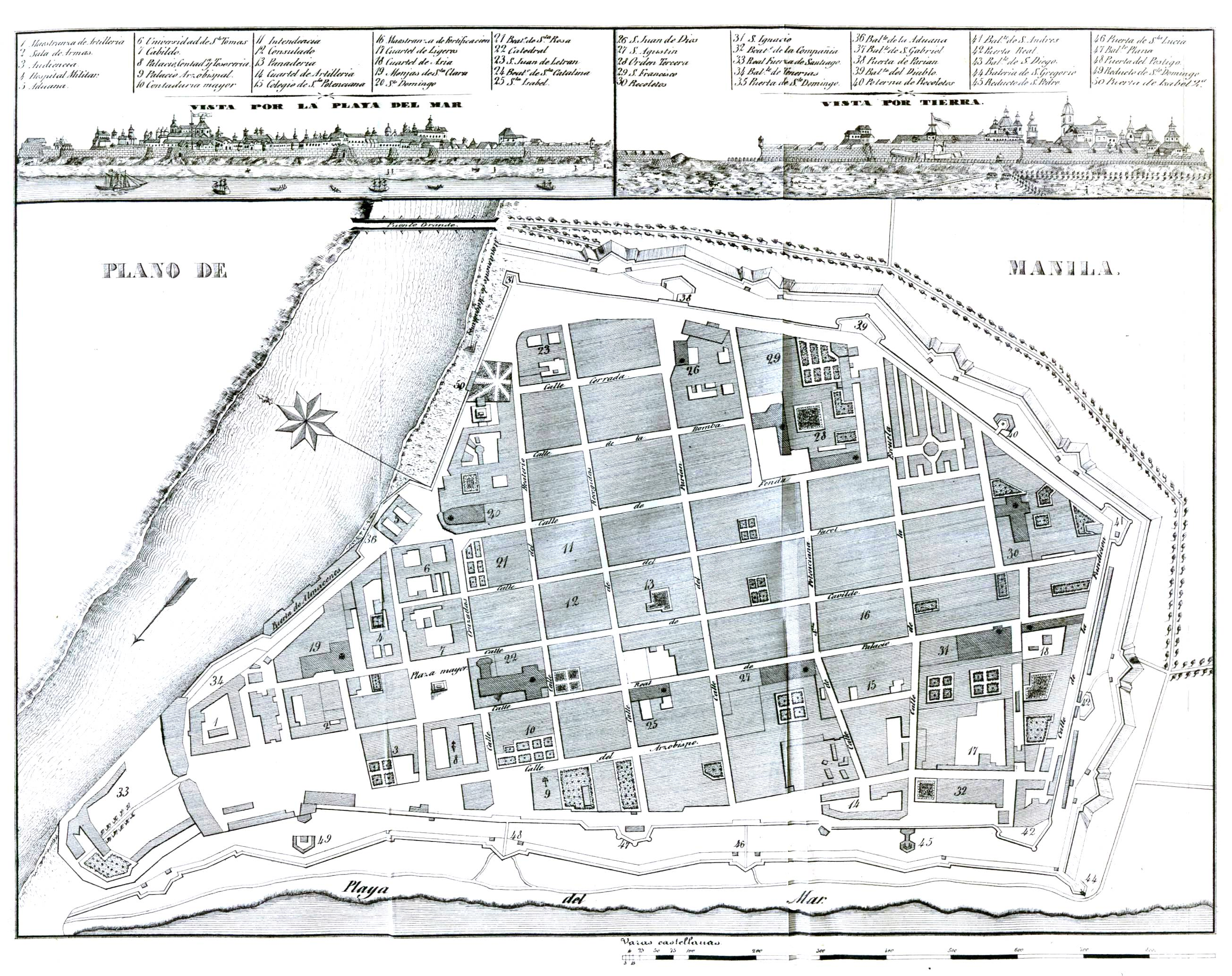
The Plano de Manila in 1851 that shows the layout of the historic walled area of Intramuros

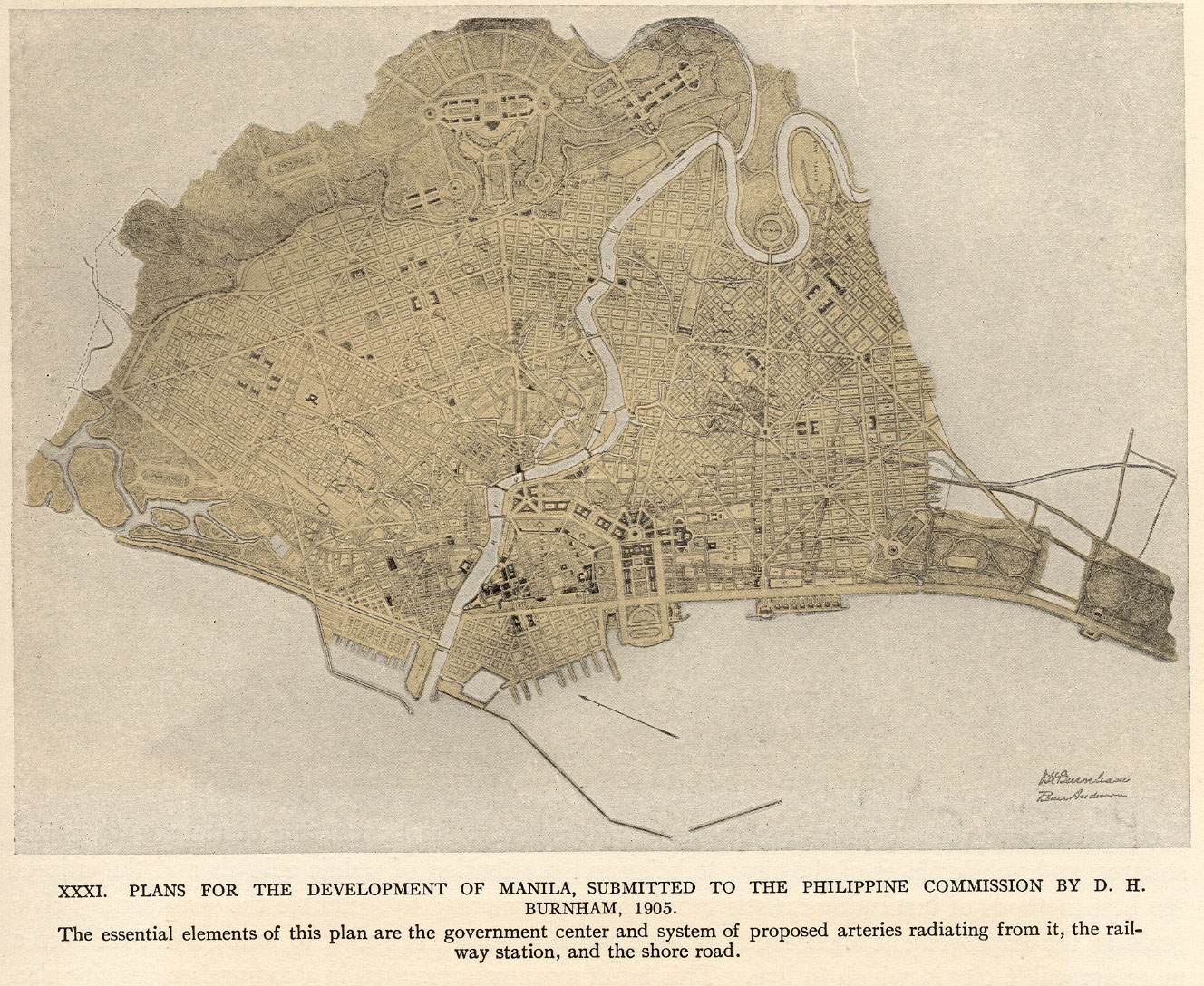
The Plan of Manila by Daniel Burnham in 1905 includes the towns and suburbs beyond the Walled City as part of the City of Manila

The 2006-2020 Comprehensive Land Use Plan of the City of Manila

Existing Land Use Map of the City of Manila

Map of the City of Manila showing points of interests

== See also ==
- Luzon
- Geography of the Philippines
- Kingdom of Tondo
- Greater Manila Area
- Mega Manila
