= Manila (province) =

Philippine province (1571–1901)

Coordinates: 14°35′N 121°00′E

Manila Maynila Tondo (1571–1859)
- Province of the Philippines
- 1571–1901
- Flag Coat of arms of colonial-era Manila

- Location of the historical province of Manila in 1899
- Capital: Manila; Mariquina (1898–1899)
- Area
  - 1898: 683 km^{2} (264 sq mi)
- Population
  - 1898: 269,793
- Historical era: Spanish colonial period
  - Legazpi's conquest of Maynila and Tondo polities: 1571
  - Became the capital of colonial Philippines: 1595
  - Occupied by Great Britain: 1762–1764
  - Renamed as Manila: 1859
  - Sovereignty transferred to the United States: 1899
  - Disestablished: 1901
Preceded by
Rajahnate of Maynila
Tondo
Namayan
Cainta (historical polity)
1858; Bulacan
Succeeded by
1853; Morong
1901; Manila
Rizal
- Today part of: Philippines

Manila, also known as Tondo until 1859, was a province of the Captaincy General of the Philippines that encompassed former pre-Hispanic polities of Tondo, Maynila, and Namayan. In 1898, it comprised the city of Manila (primarily referring to present-day Intramuros) and 23 other municipalities. In 1901, the province was dissolved, with the city of Manila absorbing five of its smaller neighboring municipalities. The remaining part was merged with the adjacent district of Morong to form the province of Rizal.

== Cities and municipalities ==
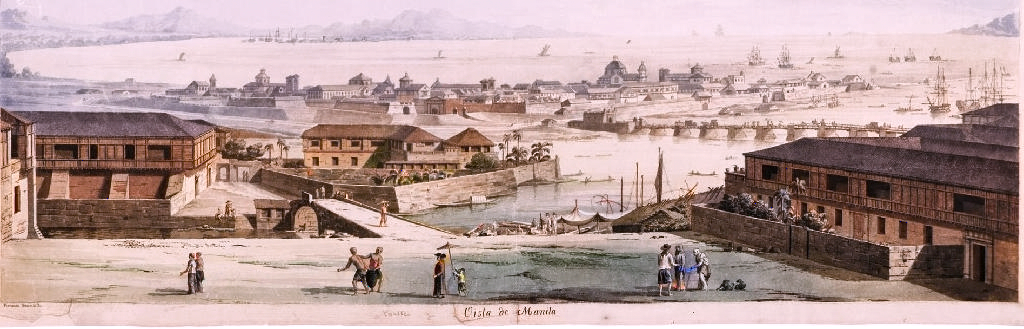
View of the Pasig River and the city of Manila with its walls from a pueblo, north of the Pasig River. Province of Tondo. Circa 1789-1794.

The province was last composed of the City of Manila and 23 other municipalities. The districts of Binondo, Quiapo, Sampaloc, San Miguel, Santa Cruz, and Tondo are often referred to as "pueblos", "arrabales" ("suburbs") or "neighbourhoods" of Manila. The name Manila originally referred to the "city within the walls" (now Intramuros), but its meaning eventually came to include the suburbs surrounding it, leading to confusion about which places constitute "Manila" in the late 19th century. From the 1860s onward, the area was often referred to as Ciudad de Manila y sus arrabales ("The City of Manila and its suburbs") or as Manila y los pueblos de extramuros ("Manila and the communities outside the walls"). The present-day City of Manila includes all these areas.

The municipalities of Antipolo, Boso-Boso, Cainta and Taytay were also part of the province, then known as Tondo, until 1853 when they was annexed to Distrito Político-Militar de los Montes de San Mateo (later known as Distrito Político-Militar de Morong).

The table below presents information from the cited source.

City/Municipality	Population (1898)	Notes
Manila (Note: Now consists of the districts of Binondo, Intramuros (old center of Manila), Quiapo, Sampaloc, San Miguel, San Nicolas, Santa Cruz, Santa Mesa, and Tondo.)	110,000	Provincial capital
Caloocan	9,843	situated 7 miles (11 km) from Manila. There are highroads to Manila, Novaliches, Mariquina, and Sampaloc.
Dilao (Note: Now part of the present-day City of Manila) (Note: Refers to Paco, Manila and also includes San Andres, Manila)	4,625	situated 3 miles (4.8 km) from Manila.
Ermita	4,726	situated 1 1/4 miles (2.0 km) from Manila.
Las Piñas	4,000	situated 8 miles (13 km) from Manila.
Malate	2,319	situated 1 2/3 miles (2.7 km) from Manila.
Malibay (Note: United with Pasay on October 12, 1903)	2,890	situated 4 miles (6.4 km) from Manila.
Mariquina (Note: Now Marikina)	10,313	situated 7 miles (11 km) from Manila. It communicates with Caloocan by a highroad. Provincial capital from 1898 to 1899 under the First Philippine Republic.
Montalban (Note: Now Rodriguez, Rizal)	3,055	situated 16 miles (26 km) from Manila.
Muntinlupa	5,068	situated 21 miles (34 km) from Manila.
Navotas	9,154	situated 6 1/4 miles (10.1 km) from Manila.
Novaliches (Note: Annexed by Caloocan in the early 20th century. Areas that historically belonged to Novaliches are now divided between northern Caloocan and Quezon City)	1,871	situated 10 miles (16 km) from Manila. It communicates with Caloocan and Manila by highroads. Ceded from Bulacan in 1858
Pandacan	2,446	situated 2 miles (3.2 km) from Manila.
Parañaque	9,863	situated at a distance of 6 1/8 miles (9.9 km) from Manila.
Pasig	22,000	situated 7 miles (11 km) from Manila.
Pateros	2,842	situated 3 miles (4.8 km) from Manila.
Pineda (Note: Now Pasay)	9,825	situated 3 1/8 miles (5.0 km) from Manila.
San Felipe Neri (Note: Now Mandaluyong)	5,465	
San Juan del Monte (Note: Now San Juan)	2,011	
San Mateo (Note: Now San Mateo, Rizal)	6,700	situated 17 miles (27 km) from Manila.
San Pedro Macati (Note: Now Makati)	3,921	situated about 3 miles (4.8 km) from Manila.
Santa Ana	2,194	situated about 3 miles (4.8 km) from Manila.
Taguig	9,662	situated 4 miles (6.4 km) from Manila.
Tambobong (Note: Now Malabon)	25,000	situated 3 miles (4.8 km) from Manila.

== Map ==
Shown below are the locations of the municipalities of the province of Manila, as of 1899. Except for Montalban and San Mateo that are in the present-day province of Rizal, all these areas are included in the present-day cities of Metro Manila.

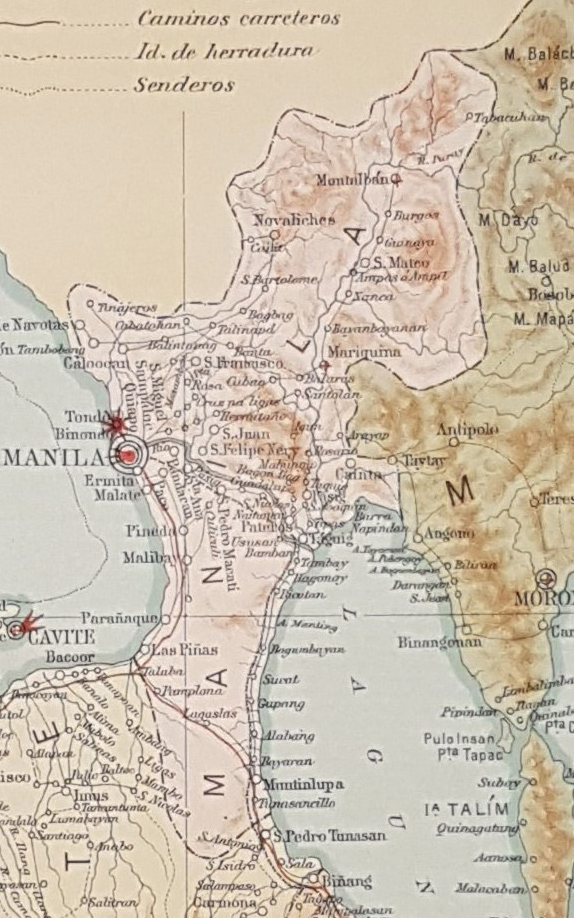
Approximate locations of the towns of the province of Manila

== See also ==
- Geography of Manila
