= Vice President of the Philippines =

Second-highest constitutional office in the Philippines

Vice President of the Republic of the Philippines
- Pangalawang Pangulo ng Pilipinas
- Vice presidential seal

- Vice presidential flag

- Incumbent; Sara Duterte since June 30, 2022
- Government of the Philippines; Office of the Vice President
- Style: Madam Vice President (informal); The Honorable (formal); Her Excellency (diplomatic)
- Status: Second highest executive branch officer
- Member of: Cabinet
- Seat: 11th Floor, Robinsons Cybergate Plaza, EDSA cor. Pioneer St., Mandaluyong 1550, Philippines
- Appointer: Direct popular vote, or, if vacant, President via congressional confirmation
- Term length: Six years, renewable once consecutively
- Constituting instrument: 1987 Constitution of the Philippines
- Formation: November 15, 1935
- First holder: Sergio Osmeña
- Succession: First
- Salary: ₱353,476 monthly
- Website: ovp.gov.ph

Vice President of the Philippines (Filipino: Pangalawang Pangulo ng Pilipinas, also referred to as Bise Presidente ng Pilipinas) is the title of the second-highest official in the executive branch of the Philippine government and is first in the presidential line of succession. The vice president is directly elected by the citizens of the Philippines and is one of only two nationally elected executive officials, the other being the president.

The current office of the vice president was re-established under the 1987 Constitution, bearing similarities with the office as created in the 1935 Constitution that was abolished by the Marcos regime. The vice president may be elected to two consecutive six-year terms. The 15th and incumbent vice president Sara Duterte was inaugurated on June 19, 2022, but her term officially began 11 days later on June 30, as per the constitution.

== Title ==
The official title of the office in Filipino is Pangalawang Pangulo, although Bise Presidente, derived from Spanish, is the usual title used in some of the major Philippine languages, such as Cebuano and Hiligaynon language. The text of the 1987 Constitution refers to the person and office of the vice-president, with a hyphen connecting the two words. However, the person and office is usually referred to today without the hyphen, as the vice president.

== History ==
=== Colonial era ===
The first known vice president claiming to be part of a government was Mariano Trías, whose term started on March 22, 1897. He was elected during the elections of the Tejeros Convention, and was later elected vice president of the Supreme Council that oversaw negotiations for the Pact of Biak-na-Bato in 1897. This Supreme Council had no sovereignty, did not govern any state, and was just used for bargaining with the Spanish. This council was replaced later, with no such position existing during the country's declaration of independence in 1898, which had a dictatorial government. Officially, the country's first actual republic was founded in 1899, and it too had no vice president. Trias instead served in the cabinets of Apolinario Mabini and Pedro Paterno, as finance minister and war minister, respectively. Trias is not considered a Philippine vice president as the Supreme Council did not proclaim any sovereign state.

=== Conceptualization and the Commonwealth ===
The 1935 Constitution, largely patterned after the U.S. Constitution, provided the basis for the Commonwealth government. It also established the position of vice president, and as per Section 12, Subsection 3, the vice president may be appointed by the president to a cabinet position. But unlike their U.S. counterpart, the vice president is not the president of the Philippine senate as senators choose their president from among their ranks. The first person elected to the position of vice president under the constitution was Sergio Osmeña, elected together with Manuel L. Quezon in the first Philippine national elections.

=== Third Republic ===
Since the inception of the 1935 constitution, the president and vice president came from the same ticket and political party, until the 1957 elections, which saw the first-ever split ticket that won the presidency and vice presidency.

=== Fourth Republic ===
The 1973 Constitution abolished the office of the vice president and Fernando Lopez was therefore unable to finish his term. Subsequent amendments, particularly the 1984 amendments restored the vice presidency. Arturo Tolentino was officially proclaimed vice president-elect by the Regular Batasang Pambansa in 1986. He took his oath as vice president on February 16, 1986, before Chief Justice Ramon Aquino, but because of popular belief that the elections had been rigged, he never actually served out his term as vice president. Within a week after Tolentino's oath, the People Power Revolution resulted in the collapse of the Marcos regime.

=== Fifth Republic ===
The People Power Revolution installed Corazon Aquino into the presidency. On February 25, 1986, Aquino and her running mate, Salvador Laurel, were sworn in as president and vice-president, respectively. Since the promulgation of the 1987 constitution, only two elections have produced a president and a vice president from the same ticket: Gloria Macapagal Arroyo and Noli de Castro in 2004 and Bongbong Marcos and Sara Duterte in 2022.

== Powers and roles ==
Aside from being mandated to assume the presidency in case of the death, disability, or resignation of the incumbent president, the 1987 Constitution did not lay out any explicit powers for the vice president, giving rise to the office being called a "spare tire". Article 7, Section 3 of the Constitution provided, however, that the vice president may be appointed to a cabinet position, without the need for confirmation. Appointments usually must be confirmed by the Commission on Appointments, as per Article 7, Section 16 of the Constitution.

=== Cabinet member ===
Since the inception of the 1935 Constitution, vice presidents have been appointed to Cabinet positions, with a few rejecting the offer made by the seating president. Osmeña was given the highest-ranking cabinet portfolio with inauguration of the Commonwealth of the Philippines in November 1935. Prior to independence in 1946, that cabinet portfolio was Secretary of Public Instruction, which had once been reserved only for the vice governor-general (an American). Vice President Osmeña held that position from 1935 to 1939, and a similar portfolio in the War Cabinet during World War II.

No.	Name	Concurrent appointment	Term began	Term ended	President	Era
1	Sergio Osmeña	Secretary of Public Instruction	November 15, 1935	April 18, 1939	Manuel L. Quezon	Commonwealth
1	Sergio Osmeña	Secretary of Public Instruction, Health, and Public Welfare	December 24, 1941	August 1, 1944	Manuel L. Quezon	Commonwealth
2	Elpidio Quirino	Secretary of Foreign Affairs	July 15, 1946	April 17, 1948	Manuel Roxas	Third Republic
3	Fernando Lopez	Secretary of Agriculture and Natural Resources	December 14, 1950	1953	Elpidio Quirino	Third Republic
4	Carlos P. Garcia	Secretary of Foreign Affairs	December 30, 1953	March 18, 1957	Ramon Magsaysay	Third Republic
5	Diosdado Macapagal	No position offered			Carlos P. Garcia	Third Republic
6	Emmanuel Pelaez	Secretary of Foreign Affairs	December 30, 1961	July 1963	Diosdado Macapagal	Third Republic
7	Fernando Lopez	Secretary of Agriculture and Natural Resources	December 30, 1965	1971	Ferdinand Marcos	Third Republic
Office abolished						Fourth Republic
8	Salvador Laurel	Secretary of Foreign Affairs	March 25, 1986	September 17, 1987	Corazon Aquino	Fifth Republic
9	Joseph Ejercito Estrada	Chairman of the Presidential Anti-Crime Commission	June 30, 1992	June 4, 1997	Fidel V. Ramos	Fifth Republic
10	Gloria Macapagal Arroyo	Secretary of Social Welfare and Development	June 30, 1998	October 12, 2000	Joseph Ejercito Estrada	Fifth Republic
11	Teofisto Guingona Jr.	Secretary of Foreign Affairs	February 9, 2001	July 15, 2002	Gloria Macapagal Arroyo	Fifth Republic
12	Noli de Castro	Chairperson of the Housing and Urban Development Coordinating Council	June 30, 2004	June 30, 2010	Gloria Macapagal Arroyo	Fifth Republic
13	Jejomar Binay	Chairperson of the Housing and Urban Development Coordinating Council	June 30, 2010	June 22, 2015	Benigno Aquino III	Fifth Republic
14	Leni Robredo	Chairperson of the Housing and Urban Development Coordinating Council	July 7, 2016	December 5, 2016	Rodrigo Duterte	Fifth Republic
15	Sara Duterte	Secretary of Education	June 30, 2022	July 19, 2024	Bongbong Marcos	Fifth Republic

After independence, the highest-ranking cabinet position became that of secretary of foreign affairs (it is still the highest-ranking cabinet portfolio in official protocol to this day), which was given to Vice President Elpidio Quirino. Vice President Fernando Lopez declined the foreign affairs portfolio when he became Quirino's vice president in 1949 and instead served as secretary of agriculture and natural resources during his two non-consecutive terms. However, Vice Presidents Carlos P. Garcia and Emmanuel Pelaez also held the foreign affairs portfolio, a tradition revived in the Fifth Republic, as well as Vice Presidents Salvador Laurel and Teofisto Guingona Jr. after the position's restoration in 1986. Gloria Macapagal Arroyo served as secretary of social welfare and development and incumbent Sara Duterte served as the secretary of education. Other Cabinet positions with no secretary title was given to Vice President Joseph Estrada as chairman of the Presidential Anti-Crime Commission and to Vice Presidents Noli de Castro, Jejomar Binay, and Leni Robredo as chairman of the Housing and Urban Development Coordinating Council.

Among the vice presidents, Diosdado Macapagal alone was not given any cabinet position, since he was the first elected vice president that did not originate from the same party as the incumbent president.

=== Successor to the Philippine president ===
The vice president is first in the presidential line of succession. The Constitution provides several circumstances where the vice president (or the vice president-elect) shall assume the presidency or serve as acting president.

- In case of the death, permanent disability, removal from office, or resignation of the president, the vice president shall assume the presidency.
- If the president-elect fails to qualify for office, the vice president-elect shall act as president until the president-elect is qualified.
- If in case of death, permanent disability, dismissed from service, resignation or failure to assume the post, the Senate president shall assume the vice presidency.
- If a president is not chosen, then the vice president shall act as president until a president is chosen and qualified.

There have been four cases where the vice president has assumed the presidency, three of which because of the president's death, and one because of the president's resignation:

- Sergio Osmeña in 1944, upon the death of Manuel L. Quezon.
- Elpidio Quirino in 1948, upon the death of Manuel Roxas.
- Carlos P. Garcia in 1957, upon the death of Ramon Magsaysay.
- Gloria Macapagal Arroyo in 2001, upon the resignation of Joseph Ejercito Estrada, as decided by the Supreme Court, following the events of the Second EDSA Revolution.

=== Other roles ===
Aside from their constitutional roles, the vice president may initiate various programs and services under the Office of the Vice President. The vice president also performs ceremonial functions, occasionally representing the president, the government, and the country in official gatherings and diplomatic functions. The vice president was also a member of the National Security Council, until its reorganization in 2025 which removed the vice president from the body.

== Election process ==
=== Eligibility ===
Article 7, Section 3 of the 1987 Constitution mandates that the vice president must bear the same qualifications as the president which is:

- a natural-born citizen of the Philippines
- a registered voter
- be able to read and write
- at least forty years of age on the day of the election
- a resident of the Philippines for at least ten years immediately preceding such election

Natural-born Filipinos are citizens of the Philippines from birth without having to perform any act to acquire or perfect their Philippine citizenship. Those whose fathers or mothers are citizens of the Philippines at the time of their birth and those born before January 17, 1973, of Filipino mothers, who elect Philippine citizenship upon reaching the age of majority are considered natural-born Filipinos.

=== Election ===
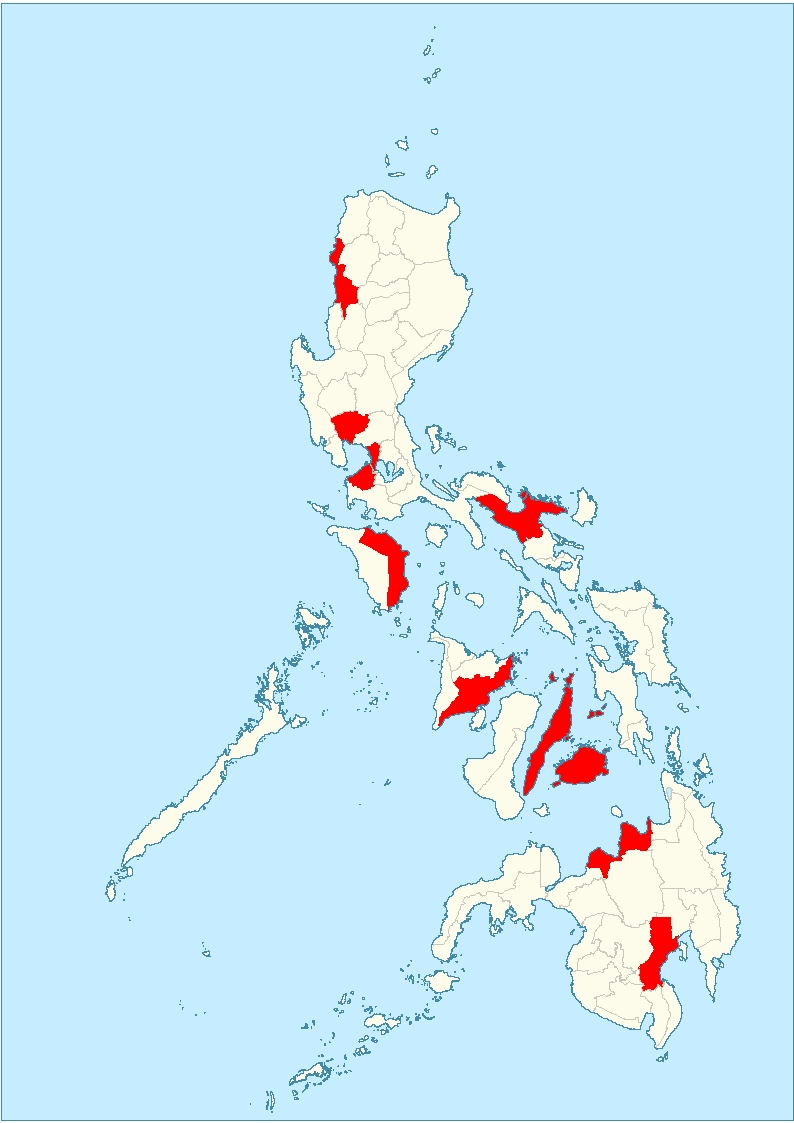
Home provinces of the vice presidents

The vice president is elected in the same manner as, but separately from, the president: by direct vote every six years, usually on the second Monday of May. The latest election was held in 2022.

Both the president and the vice president are elected by direct plurality vote where the candidate who garners the highest number of votes, whether a majority or not, wins the election. While candidates usually run in tandem for the offices of president and vice president, under their own political parties, it is possible and not unusual for candidates from different parties to be elected as president and vice president; since the establishment of the Fifth Republic in 1986, only the elections of 2004 and 2022 had the winners come from a single ticket.

The returns of every election for president and vice president, duly certified by the board of canvassers of each province or city, shall be transmitted to Congress, directed to the president of the Senate. Upon receipt of the certificates of canvass, the president of the Senate shall open all the certificates in the presence of a joint public session of Congress not later than 30 days after election day. Congress then canvasses the votes upon determining that the polls are authentic and were done in the manner provided by law.

=== Inauguration ===
Traditionally, the vice president takes the oath first, a little before noon for two reasons. First, according to protocol, no one follows the president (who is last due to his supremacy), and second, to establish a constitutionally valid successor before the president-elect accedes. During the Quezon inauguration, however, the vice president and legislature were sworn in after the president, to symbolize a new start. In 2016 and 2022, the inaugurations for president and vice president were held separately. Vice President-elect Sara Duterte broke tradition by taking oath on June 19, 2022, or days ahead prior to her scheduled assumption of office on June 30.

The vice president-elect recites an oath, similar to the one recited by the president-elect, as provided by the 1987 Constitution:

"I, (name), do solemnly swear (or affirm), that I will faithfully and conscientiously fulfill my duties as President (or Vice President or Acting President) of the Philippines. Preserve and defend its Constitution, execute its laws, do justice to every man, and consecrate myself to the service of the Nation. So help me God." (In case of affirmation, last sentence will be omitted.) — Constitution of the Philippines, art. 7, sec. 5

The Filipino text of the oath used for the inaugurations of presidents Fidel V. Ramos, Joseph Estrada, Benigno Aquino III, and Bongbong Marcos reads:

"Ako si (pangalan), ay taimtim kong pinanunumpaan (o pinatototohanan) na tutuparin ko nang buong katapatan at sigasig ang aking mga tungkulin bilang Pangulo (o Pangalawang Pangulo o Nanunungkulang Pangulo) ng Pilipinas, pangangalagaan at ipagtatanggol ang kanyang Konstitusyon, ipatutupad ang mga batas nito, magiging makatarungan sa bawat tao, at itatalaga ang aking sarili sa paglilingkod sa Bansa. Kasihan nawa ako ng Diyos." (Kapag pagpapatotoo, ang huling pangungusap ay kakaltasin. — Konstitusyon ng Pilipinas, Artikulo VII, SEK. 5

Traditionally, the language that the incoming president uses for his oath shall also be the one used by the incoming vice president.

== Incumbency ==
=== Term limits ===
Under the 1935 Constitutions, the vice president, along with the president, set the vice president's term at six years, with possibility of re-election as only the president was barred from seeking re-election. In 1940, it shortened the term from six to four years, again without limitations on the number of terms for the vice president. The president, however, was barred from serving more than two terms. Under the provisions of these constitutions, only vice presidents Osmeña and Lopez have won re-election.

To date, only Fernando Lopez has served more than one term (a total of three terms), from 1949 to 1951, from 1965 to 1969, and again from 1969 until 1972 when the office was abolished. Under the 1987 Constitution, the vice president is barred from serving more than two consecutive terms (i.e. can be re-elected after one election cycle in between the last allowed term).

=== Impeachment ===
Impeachment in the Philippines follows procedures similar to the United States. The House of Representatives, one of the houses of the bicameral Congress, has the exclusive power to initiate all cases of impeachment against the president, vice president, members of the Supreme Court, members of the Constitutional Commissions and the ombudsman. When a third of its membership has endorsed the impeachment articles, it is then transmitted to the Senate of the Philippines which tries and decide, as impeachment tribunal, the impeachment case. A main difference from US proceedings however is that only a third of House members are required to approve the motion to impeach the president (as opposed to the majority required in the United States). In the Senate, selected members of the House of Representatives act as the prosecutors and the senators act as judges with the Senate president and chief justice of the Supreme Court jointly presiding over the proceedings. Like the United States, to convict the official in question requires that a minimum of two-thirds (i.e., 16 of 24 members) of the senate vote in favor of conviction. If an impeachment attempt is unsuccessful or the official is acquitted, no new cases can be filed against that impeachable official for at least one full year.

The Constitution enumerates the culpable violation of the Constitution, treason, bribery, graft and corruption, other high crimes, and betrayal of public trust as grounds for the impeachment of the vice president, as applicable for the president, the members of the Supreme Court, the members of the Constitutional Commissions, and the ombudsman.

Sara Duterte is the first and only vice president in Philippine history to have been impeached by the House of Representatives. On February 5, 2025, 215 lawmakers signed the impeachment complaint against Duterte, with an additional 25 representatives signing a document the following day in support of the complaint, bringing the total to 240. Voting 19-4-1, the complaint had been "archived" by the Senate; it is not yet clear if a trial could proceed later, in consideration of the pending motions for reconsideration before the Supreme Court.

=== Vacancy ===
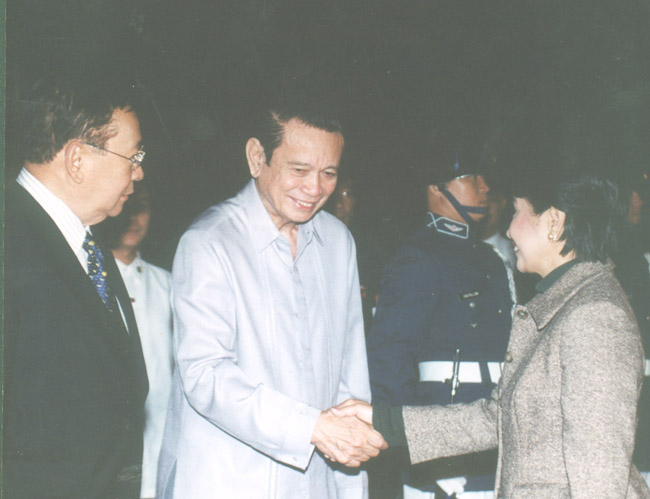
Vice President Teofisto Guingona was appointed by President Gloria Macapagal-Arroyo.

Section 9 of Article VII of the 1987 Philippines Constitution provides that whenever the office of vice president is vacant, the president shall nominate a vice president from among members of the Senate and House of Representatives, who shall assume office upon confirmation by a majority vote of all members of both houses of Congress, voting separately. When the vice president becomes the president by succession, the new president can nominate a member of the Congress subject to confirmation from the majority of all members of both houses of the Congress. The Senate president may not directly be in succession for the position of the vice presidency, unless nominated.

There is only one instance where a member of the Congress has assumed a vacancy in the vice president position, that is in the case of then-Senator Teofisto Guingona Jr., who was appointed as vice president of the Philippines by Arroyo on February 7, 2001. Guingona is the only vice president not nationally elected to the position. He is also the oldest person to have held the position, being appointed at the age of 72. He also concurrently served as secretary of foreign affairs.

=== Official residence ===
Historically, the vice president was not given an official residence. However, the vice president also held office along with the president at the Executive Building (now Kalayaan Hall) in the complex of Malacañang Palace from 1935 until 1972, when the position was abolished under martial law and the 1973 Constitution.

When the position was reinstated, Vice President Salvador H. Laurel held office at the former Legislative Building on Padre Burgos Avenue, Manila, until the building became the National Museum of Fine Arts of the National Museum of the Philippines. The vice president's office was transferred to the Philippine International Convention Center, and again to the PNB Financial Center, both in Pasay, Metro Manila in 2005. In 2011, the Coconut Palace, also in Pasay, was designated as the principal workplace of the vice president of the Philippines. Beginning June 30, 2016, the office was transferred to the Quezon City Reception House in Quezon City. In July 2022, the vice president's office was transferred to Cybergate Plaza in Mandaluyong, Metro Manila. Vice President Sara Duterte plans to establish a permanent office for the position.

=== Travel ===
Vice presidents Elpidio Quirino and Fernando Lopez used a 1946 Packard Clipper.

The official state car of the Vice President of the Philippines from 1994 to 2016 was a Mercedes-Benz W140 S-Class. Jejomar Binay, the Vice President between 2010 and 2016, used a bulletproof Toyota Land Cruiser 200 Series (which was replaced by the LC 300 Series in 2022) or a Lexus LX 570 on some occasions.

The Vice President is also accompanied by a convoy of vehicles such as the Toyota Innova, Hilux, Fortuner, HiAce, Coaster, Land Cruisers, and Nissan Urvan, which contain personnel and security. In some instances, a Toyota Sequoia was also utilized by Vice President Duterte.

Vice President Sara Duterte uses a Sikorsky S-76C++ helicopter. It has been criticized by some people, who argue that it is a waste of taxpayer money. However, the Vice President's office has defended the use of the helicopter, saying that it is necessary for her to travel quickly and safely around the country, and so she can visit her children anytime.

=== Security ===
The Vice Presidential Security and Protection Group (VPSPG) is tasked with providing the vice president and his or her immediate family security throughout their term in office. Previously a separate unit, the VPSPG was put under the Presidential Security Command in 2024. Prior to the VPSPG's activation in 2022, the Vice Presidential Security Detachment (VPSD) was responsible for the security of the vice president, from Salvador Laurel to Leni Robredo. Similar to the setup of the PSC, the VPSPG's personnel jointly comes from the Armed Forces of the Philippines and the Philippine National Police.

As of November 2024, the VPSPG has a strength of 350 military and police personnel. In 2022, a Commission of Audit (COA) report revealed that the VPSPG had an initial strength of 433 personnel. By contrast, in 2020, the then-VPSD had a maximum of 83 personnel, before being reduced to 78 the following year.

== Post-vice presidency ==
Several vice presidents either lose re-election alongside their running mate or ascend to the presidency. After having been re-elected in 1941, Osmeña ascended to the presidency after President Quezon's death. Vice presidents Quirino and Garcia never ran for re-election as vice president as they would ascend to the presidency following the president's death. Vice president Lopez did not run for re-election in 1953, opting to run for senator instead. After being elected in 1998, Arroyo ascended to the presidency after President Estrada was ousted in the Second EDSA Revolution. She later ran for re-election in 2004 and won. Five vice presidents ran for the presidency after their vice presidential term ended. Two of them, Macapagal in 1961 and Estrada in 1998 won. Three of them, Laurel in 1992, Binay in 2016, and Robredo in 2022 lost.

Five vice presidents ran for another office after their vice presidential term ended and two succeeded. In 1953, Lopez ran and won for senator, finishing first. He would go on to win the vice presidency once more in 1965 and 1969. President Macapagal's running mate Pelaez also did not seek re-election for vice president, but instead sought the nomination of the opposing Nacionalista nomination for president, which he would eventually lose to then-senator Marcos. He would run for a seat in the House of Representatives in 1965 and won. In 2022, two vice presidents ran for senator; Binay lost, while de Castro withdrew less than a week after filing his candidacy. In 2025, Robredo ran for and won the position of Mayor of Naga City. She is the first former vice president who did not later serve as president to run for and win a seat in a local executive position.

Only Teofisto Guingona Jr. did not pursue other office after his vice presidential term ended.

== See also ==
- List of vice presidents of the Philippines
- President of the Philippines
- List of presidents of the Philippines
- List of current vice presidents
- Prime Minister of the Philippines (defunct)
- Seal of the vice president of the Philippines
- First ladies and gentlemen of the Philippines

Order of precedence
Preceded by None	1st in line	Succeeded by President of the Senate; Sherwin Gatchalian
