= Flag of the president of the Philippines =

Flag used by presidents of the Philippines

- Use: Presidential standard
- Proportion: 1:2
- Adopted: 2004 (standard design defined in 1951)
- Design: Blue field defaced with the presidential coat of arms
- Designed by: Galo Ocampo

The flag of the president of the Philippines (Filipino: watawat ng pangulo ng Pilipinas) or the presidential standard of the Philippines consists of the presidential coat of arms on a blue background. While having the same design as the presidential seal since 1947, the presidential standard has a separate history, and its design and that of the seal have at different times influenced each other. The flag is often displayed beside the President of the Philippines in official portraits, flown next to the coffin of a deceased president in state funerals (the national flag is the pall on the casket), and flown in the president's motorcade. It is also customarily used during diplomatic visits in the review of honor guards. A lone honor guard traditionally holds the presidential standard while walking behind the President of the Philippines and a visiting foreign leader. The design is similar to that of the flag of the president of the United States.

== 1935 flag ==
1935 presidential flag

The first presidential standard was introduced during the presidency of Manuel Quezon in 1935, following the inauguration of the Philippine Commonwealth. Patterned after the U.S. presidential flag, the standard featured the Commonwealth coat of arms emblazoned on a navy blue field, with a five-pointed star in each of the four corners. The stars held no particular meaning.

This flag was said to have been based on the flag of the American Governor-General, which was itself inspired by the 1912 design of the U.S. presidential standard.

== 1946 flag ==
1946 presidential flag

In 1946, following the inauguration of the Third Philippine Republic, the coat of arms of the Commonwealth was replaced with the new coat of arms of the republic, designed by Galo Ocampo. The four stars in the corners were retained. The new coat of arms had the following blazon:

Pale ways of two pieces, azure and gules; a chief argent studded with three golden stars equidistant from each other; in point of honor, ovoid argent over all the sun rayonnant with eight minor and lesser rays; in sinister base gules, the Lion Rampant of Spain; in dexter base azure, the American eagle displayed proper. Beneath, a scroll with the words 'Republic of the Philippines' inscribed thereon.

== 1947 flag ==
1947 presidential flag

On January 7, 1947, President Manuel Roxas signed Executive Order No. 38, which provided for the coat of arms, seal, and flag of the President of the Philippines. The national coat of arms was replaced by the introduction of the presidential arms, also designed by Galo Ocampo, featuring the Philippine sun and a golden sea-lion (ultramar) on a red equilateral triangle, with five-pointed stars at each corner.

Section 3 of the order states that “the color and flag of the President of the Philippines shall consist of a dark blue background of sizes and proportions to conform to military and naval custom,” and that “the proportions of the elements of the coat of arms shall be in direct relation to the hoist and the fly shall vary according to the customs of the military and naval services.” While the order made no explicit mention of the use of four corner stars, they were nevertheless retained in practice.

== 1951 flag ==
1951 presidential flag

On July 4, 1951, during the celebration of the fifth anniversary of Philippine independence, President Elpidio Quirino issued Executive Order No. 457, amending Section 1 of the 1947 Roxas order to feature the presidential coat of arms surrounded by a ring of stars corresponding to the number of provinces of the Philippines as of the date of signing. This change followed the American practice of adding stars after new states were admitted to the union, adopted following their design revision in 1945.

Although the stars in the official design were specified to be golden yellow, the reproduced flags that came into use featured white stars instead, an inconsistency that persisted until the flag's design was standardized in 2004. Subsequent designs continued this practice, increasing the number of stars in the ring each time new provinces were created.

== 1981 flag ==
1981 presidential flag

In 1981, Ferdinand Marcos had the presidential standard redesigned along with the seal, replacing the ultramar sea-lion with an eagle inside an inverted triangle.

No enabling order is known to have officially adopted the design, but it remained in use until Marcos was ousted by the People Power Revolution in 1986.

== Restoration of the 1951 design ==
1986 presidential flag

After the EDSA revolt, President Corazon Aquino abolished the use of many symbols associated with the Marcos regime, particularly the presidential seal and flag. The design was reverted to the 1951 version, but the navy blue field was changed to a lighter shade. Ambiguity in the issuances regarding the design’s details and inconsistencies in the production of the standard continued in succeeding administrations until that of President Arroyo in 2004.

== Current flag ==
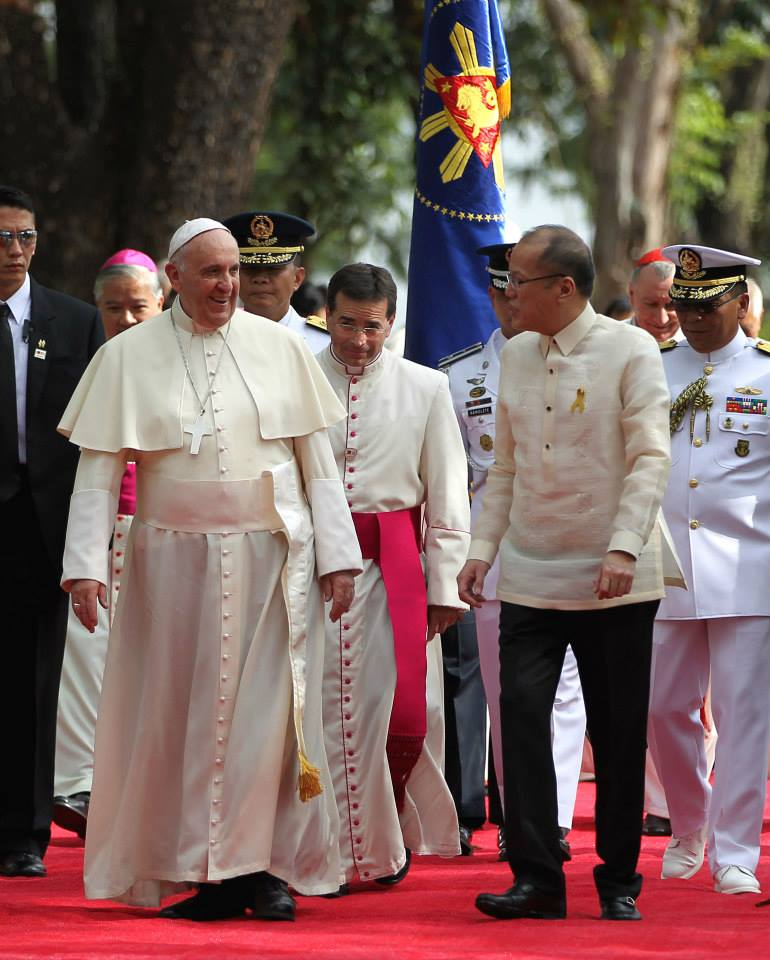
The Presidential flag behind Philippine President Benigno Aquino III and Pope Francis during the latter's state visit to the Philippines.

The current flag is defined in Executive Order No. 310 signed by President Gloria Macapagal Arroyo:

The Flag of the President of the Philippines shall consist of the Coat-of-Arms of the President in proper colors, with a rectangular blue background (instead of the circular blue shield). The shade of the blue background shall conform to the blue color of the National Flag enumerated in Republic Act No. 8491, the Flag and Heraldic Code of the Philippines. The fringe shall be of knotted yellow silk. The ratio of the Flag shall be 1:2.

== Reproduction ==
The manufacturing, reproduction, sale, purchase for sale, use, display, or possession in commercial quantities of the presidential standard is strictly prohibited, including its use on stationery, business cards, identification cards, or any other items, except as permitted under the exceptions provided in Section 3 of Executive Order No. 310, s. 2004.

== See also ==
- President of the Philippines
- Flag of the vice president of the Philippines
- Seal of the president of the Philippines
- Flag of the Philippines
