= Seal of the vice president of the Philippines =

Seal

Seal of the Vice President of the Philippines Sagisag ng Pangalawang Pangulo ng Pilipinas

Versions
- The coat of arms of the vice president of the Philippines as defined by Executive Order No. 310 of 2004
- Armiger: Vice President of the Philippines
- Adopted: 1947 (current definition from 2004)
- Shield: A circular white shield with an eight-rayed golden-yellow Philippine sun at the center. Overlapping the Philippine sun is a red equilateral triangle. Inside and at the center of the equilateral triangle is the traditional golden-yellow sea lion (Ultramar) of the Coat-of-Arms granted to the City of Manila in 1596, on guard with a sword on its right paw, at hilt. Inside and at the corner of each of the three (3) angles of the equilateral triangle, a five-pointed golden-yellow star to represent Luzon, Visayas, and Mindanao, respectively.
- Use: On documents from the vice president to members of government, and as a symbol on vice presidential vehicles, podiums, and other places

The seal of the vice president of the Philippines (Filipino: Sagisag ng Pangalawang Pangulo ng Pilipinas) is a symbol used to represent the history and dignity of the vice president of the Philippines. Its design was prescribed by Executive Order No. 310 of 2004, and is similar in design to the seal of the president of the Philippines.

== Description and symbolism ==
The seal is composed of the coat of arms of the vice president, which, according to Executive Order No. 310 of 2004 consists of:

A circular white shield with an eight-rayed golden-yellow Philippine sun at the center. Overlapping the Philippine sun is a red equilateral triangle. Inside and at the center of the equilateral triangle is the traditional golden-yellow sea lion (Ultramar) of the Coat-of-Arms granted to the City of Manila in 1596, on guard with a sword on its right paw, at hilt. Inside and at the corner of each of the three (3) angles of the equilateral triangle, a five-pointed golden-yellow star to represent Luzón, Visayas, and Mindanao, respectively.

The coat of arms is then surrounded by a blue circle. The upper arc of the white circle contains the words SAGISAG NG PANGALAWANG PANGULO NG PILIPINAS ("Seal of the Vice President of the Philippines") in white letters. The bottom of the outer rim is marked with one five-pointed white star.

== History ==
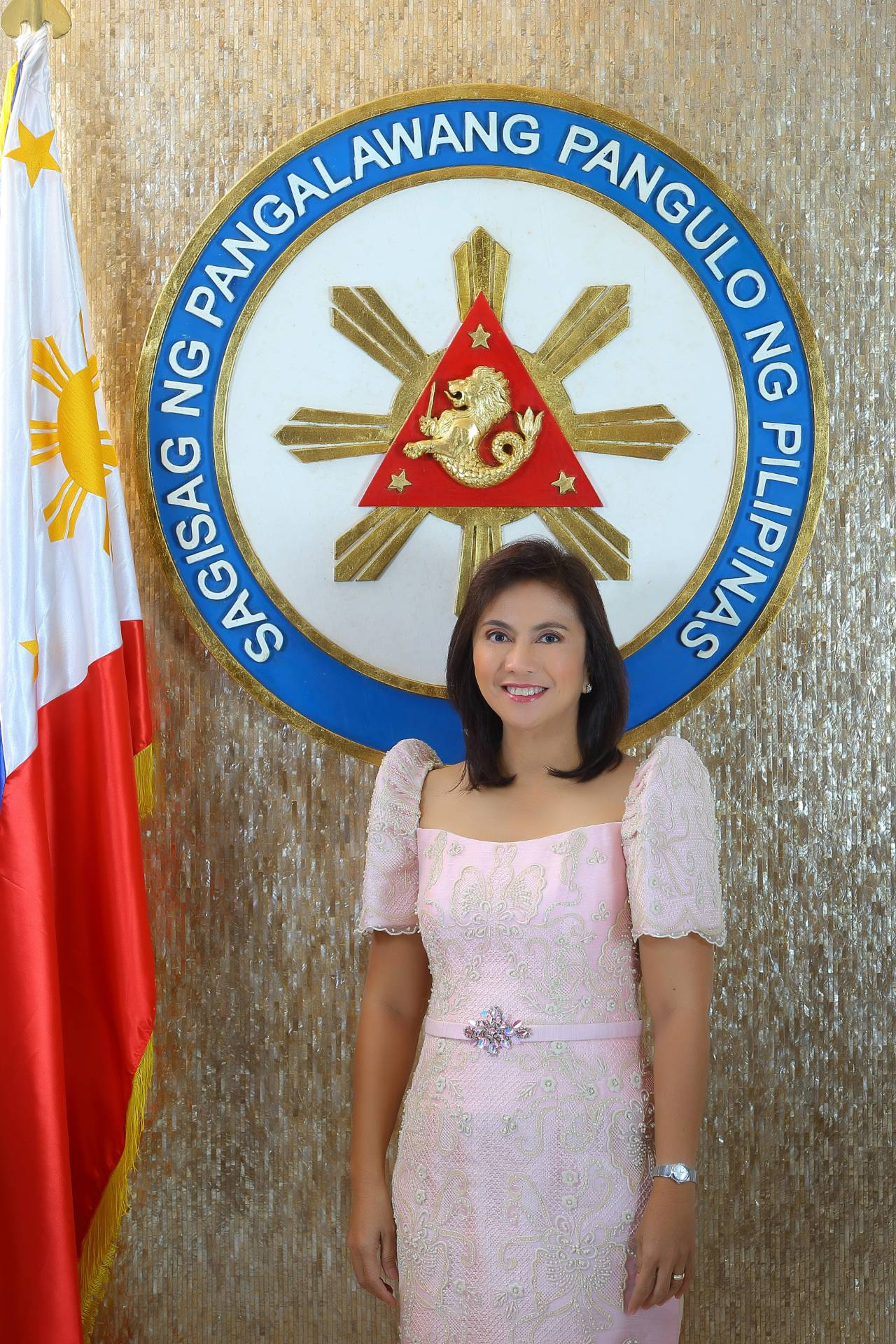
Official portrait of Vice President Leni Robredo featuring the current design of the seal.

The seal was first defined in 1947 by Executive Order No. 38 signed by President Manuel Roxas, in which the presidential flag and seal were created. It indicated that the vice presidential seal will follow the pattern of the President's, except that the sun and sea-lion were to be blue to create a distinction. After President Elpidio Quirino amended Roxas' order, he changed the design of the coat of arms, and ordered that it will be identical to the president's, but without the ring of stars. This version of the arms and seal was used until 1972, when the office was abolished by martial law and subsequently excluded from the original text of the 1973 Constitution.

After the position was restored in 1986, a literal reading of Quirino's order caused confusion as to the appearance of the coat of arms and seal. Thus, the government adopted the seal with a similar design to the President's with a blue background but no circle of stars and it is surrounded by text contains the words SEAL OF THE VICE PRESIDENT OF THE PHILIPPINES, with a single, blue dot in the space between the beginning and end of the text.

To create a distinction between the presidential and vice presidential coat of arms and seal, President Gloria Macapagal Arroyo in 2004 signed Executive Order No. 310, defining the design of both positions' coats of arms, seals and flags. The first vice president to use this version of the seal was Noli De Castro.

== Historical seals ==
The design of the seal when the position was restored in 1986. Note the similarities compared to the presidential seal.

Current instance, as prescribed by Executive Order No. 310, which was signed into law on April 20, 2004

== See also ==
- Vice President of the Philippines
- Flag of the vice president of the Philippines
- Seal of the president of the Philippines
- Coat of arms of the Philippines
