= Sea-lion =

Half-cat half-fish mythic creature

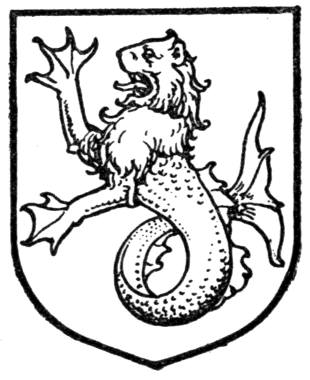
A sea-lion, illustrated in A Complete Guide to Heraldry (1909).

In heraldry, the term sea-lion (sometimes called a morse) refers to a legendary creature that has the head and upper body of a lion, but with webbed forelimbs and a fish tail. These occur most frequently as supporters, but also occur as crests and occasionally as charges. Sea-lions are frequently found in "sejant" or "sejant-erect" (sitting upright) attitudes, but may also be found "naiant" (horizontally, as if swimming) or "assurgeant" (issuing from the waves of the sea).

== In the Philippines ==
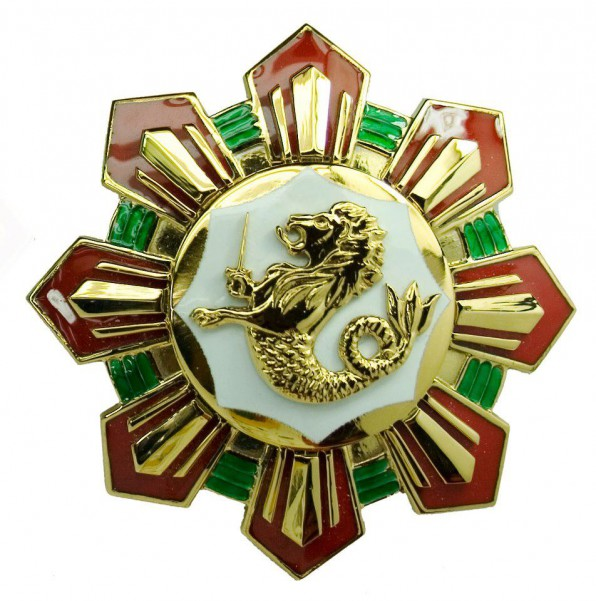
Philippine Legion of Honor

The sea-lion is prominent in the heraldic tradition of the Philippines, where it denotes state power and authority. It features on the coats of arms of the capital, the primatial see, the seal of the navy, the presidential seal, the seals of the Department of Finance, the Department of Education and other various government offices. It can also be found on the medal of the Philippine Legion of Honor.

The heraldic device comes from Manila's colonial arms, where the sea-lion represents the islands as an ultramar (overseas) possession of Spain; the lion is ultimately derived from the Arms of Castile and León.

On May 30, 1596, Philip II of Spain gave Manila its own specific coat of arms:

"On the upper half of the coat of arms is a castle of gold on a red field, with a door and windows in blue, atop the shield a crown. On the lower half, on a blue field is a figure half lion half dolphin in silver, with colored claws and tongue, holding in its paw an unsheathed sword..."

== In other countries ==
- A sea-lion can be seen on the Crest of the 8th Marine Regiment of the United States Marine Corps.
- The carp statue, in front of Chenghuang Temple (城隍廟; Chénghuáng Miào) in Hsinchu City, Taiwan.

== Gallery ==
A crowned sea-lion in the coat of arms of the city of Burgas, Bulgaria.

Coat of arms of Bogor during the Dutch colonisation

Arms of Spanish Manila, which were sometimes used for the Philippines as a whole.

The present arms of the City of Manila.

== See also ==
- Merlion, a similar mythic creature and the national symbol of Singapore
