= Flag of the vice president of the Philippines =

Flag used by vice presidents of the Philippines

- Use: Vice presidential standard
- Proportion: 1:2
- Adopted: 2004
- Design: White field defaced with the vice presidential coat of arms

The flag of the vice president of the Philippines (Filipino: watawat ng pangalawang pangulo ng Pilipinas) or the vice presidential standard of the Philippines consists of the vice presidential coat of arms on a white background. The flag is most frequently displayed in the vice president's office and during official functions where the vice president is present, mostly during speeches.

The first official design of the flag was created in 1947, followed by two succeeding iterations before a redesign similar to the presidential standard was adopted in 2004.

== Design ==
The current flag is defined in Executive Order 310 signed by President Gloria Macapagal Arroyo:

The Flag of the Vice President of the Philippines shall consist of the Coat-of-Arms of the Vice President in proper colors, with a rectangular white background (instead of the circular white shield). The fringe shall be of knotted yellow silk. The ratio of the Flag shall be 1:2.

The design of the flag is essentially identical to the presidential standard. The background color, consistent across all historical versions, is white. Unlike the presidential coat of arms, the vice president’s arms does not feature a ring of stars around the sun.

== Usage ==
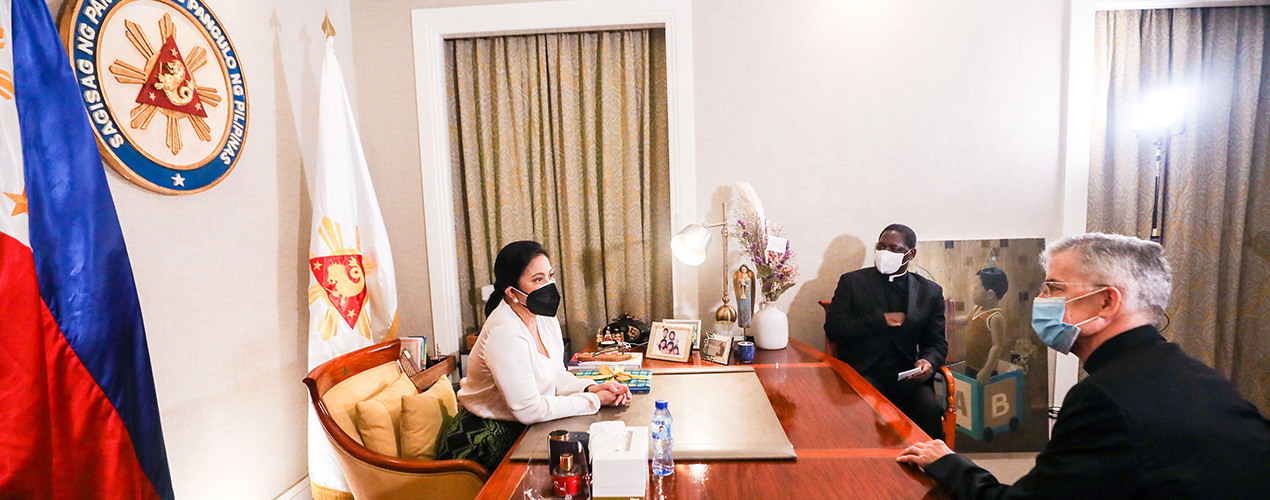
Vice President Leni Robredo meets with Apostolic Nuncio to the Philippines Charles John Brown in August 2021, with the vice presidential seal and flag displayed in the background.

The vice president's color, featuring a golden yellow fringe, is displayed in the office, usually alongside the flag of the Philippines or the flag of the Office of the Vice President (a white field bearing the office’s seal), and is sometimes used as a backdrop during speeches.

The flag has also been displayed in the office of the executive department concurrently headed by the vice president, as was the case with Vice President Sara Duterte during her tenure as Secretary of Education from 2022 to 2024. Unlike the presidential standard, the vice president’s flag is not typically featured in official portraits, where the national flag is preferred.

== History ==
=== 1947 flag ===
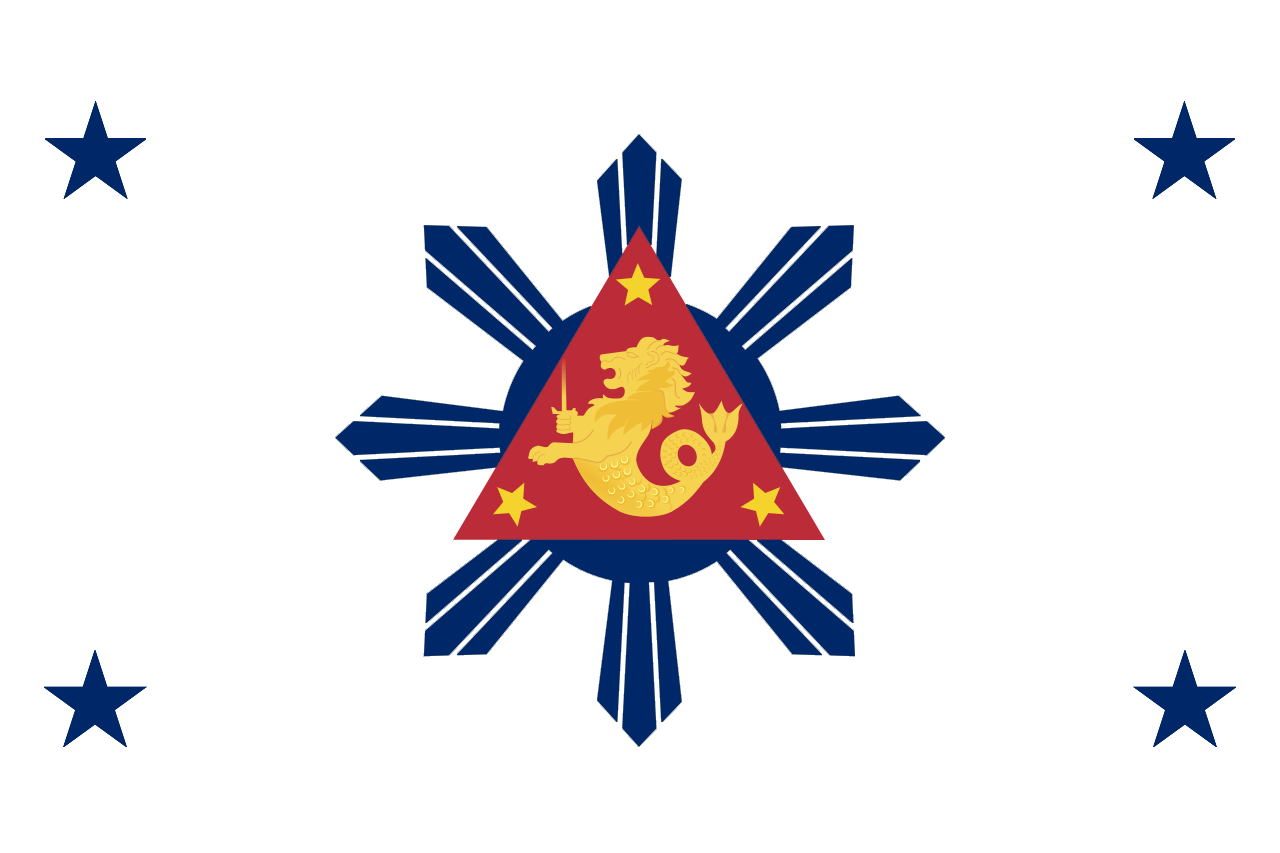
1947 vice presidential flag

The flag was first defined in 1947 by Executive Order No. 38 (s. 1947) signed by President Manuel Roxas, in which the presidential flag and seal were created. It indicated that the vice presidential flag will follow the pattern of the president's, except that the sun and the corner stars were to be blue to create a distinction.

SEC. 4. The flag and colors of the Vice President of the Philippines shall be of the same design but with following sun in blue, corner stars in blue and entire design in white rectangular background.

=== 1951 flag ===
1951 vice presidential flag based on the specifications in Executive Order No. 457.

Purported design of the flag as used by Vice President Fernando Lopez.

After President Elpidio Quirino amended Roxas's order under Executive Order No. 457 (s. 1951), he changed the design of the coat of arms, and ordered that it will be identical to the president's, but without the ring of stars. This version of the flag was used until 1972 when the office was abolished by martial law and subsequently excluded from the original text of the 1973 Constitution.

Photographic evidence from the Iloilo ancestral home of Maria Salvacion Javellana, the wife of Vice President Fernando Lopez, suggests that a vice presidential standard similar to the president’s flag in 1947 was used by Lopez. The flag featured the vice presidential coat of arms on a white field with four golden yellow corner stars. It remains unknown when exactly the flag was in use – whether during the first two years of his vice presidency, when the Roxas order had not yet been amended, or afterward, either during the Quirino or Marcos administrations, when President Quirino modified the design to follow the presidential standard without the ring of stars, but without specifying whether the four corner stars remained.

=== 1986 flag ===
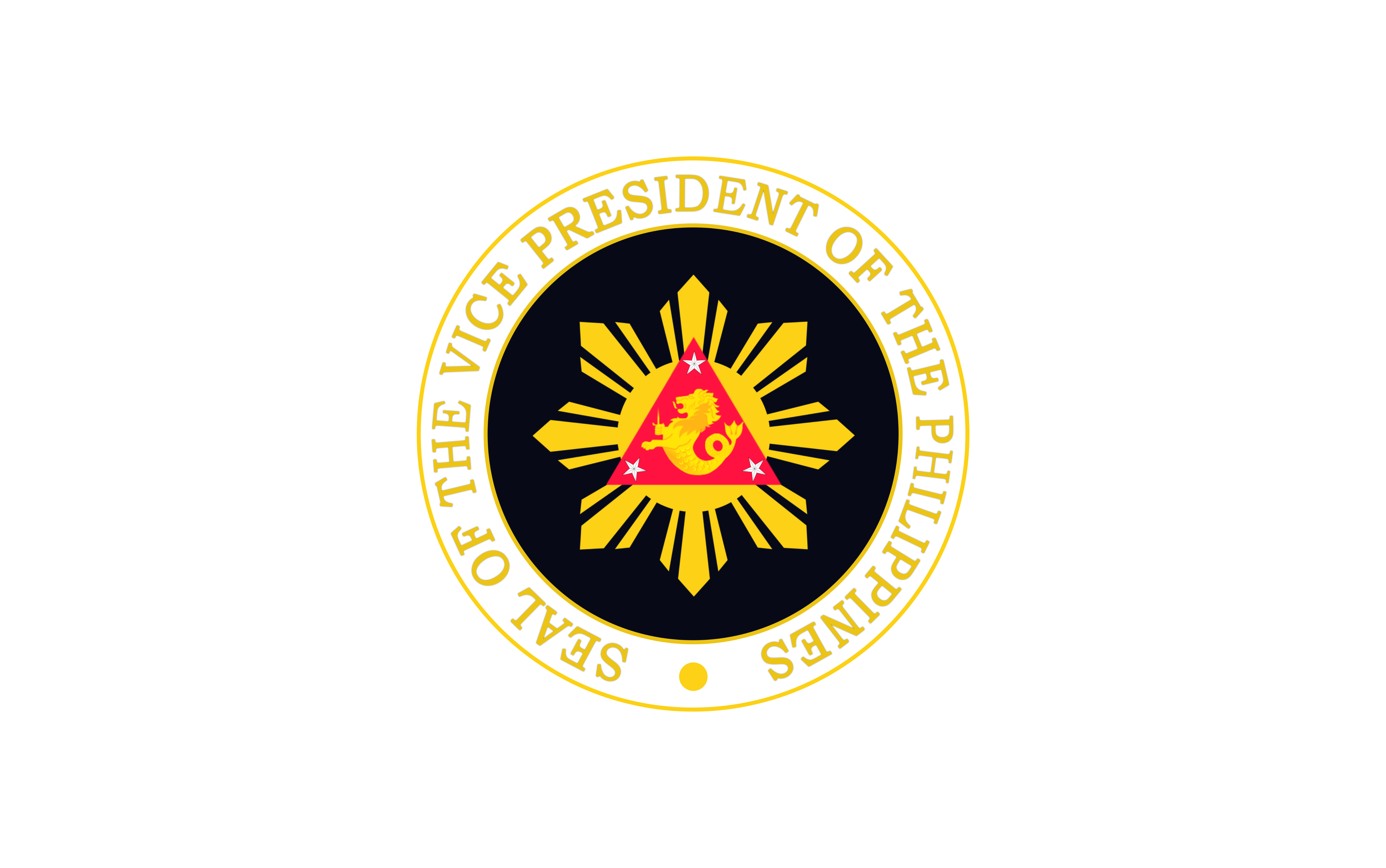
1986 vice presidential flag

After the position was restored in 1986, a literal reading of Quirino's order caused confusion as to the appearance of the flag and the coat of arms. While the government adopted the seal with a blue background, they have adopted a flag in white background.

=== 2004 flag ===
To clarify the subsequent executive orders regarding the vice presidential coat-of-arms, seal and flag, President Gloria Macapagal Arroyo in 2004 signed Executive Order No. 310, defining the design of both positions' coats-of-arms, seals and flags.

== See also ==
- Vice President of the Philippines
- Seal of the vice president of the Philippines
- Flag of the president of the Philippines
