= Seal of the president of the Philippines =

Seal of the President of the Philippines Sagisag ng Pangulo ng Pilipinas

Versions
- The coat of arms of the president of the Philippines as defined by Executive Order No. 310 of 2004
- Armiger: President of the Philippines
- Adopted: 1947 (current definition from 2004)
- Shield: A circular blue shield with an eight-rayed golden-yellow Philippine sun at the center. Overlapping the Philippine sun is a red equilateral triangle. Inside and at the center of the equilateral triangle is the traditional golden-yellow sea lion (Ultramar) of the Coat-of-Arms granted to the City of Manila in 1596, on guard with a sword on its right paw, at hilt. Inside and at the corner of each of the three (3) angles of the equilateral triangle, a five-pointed golden-yellow star to represent Luzon, Visayas, and Mindanao, respectively.
- Other elements: The whole are encircled at the outer edge of the blue shield by five-pointed golden-yellow stars, with one point of each star pointing outward on the imaginary radiating center lines, the number of stars conforming to the number of provinces of the Republic of the Philippines at any given time. (Currently 82)
- Use: On documents from the president to members of government, and as a symbol on presidential vehicles, podiums, and other places

The seal of the president of the Philippines (Filipino: sagisag ng pangulo ng Pilipinas) is a symbol used to represent the history and dignity of the president of the Philippines. Its original form was designed by Captain Galo B. Ocampo, secretary of the Philippine Heraldry Committee, and patterned after the seal of the president of the United States. It was first used by President Manuel Roxas in 1947.

== Description and symbolism ==
The seal is composed of the coat of arms of the president, which, according to Executive Order No. 310 of 2004 consists of:

A circular blue shield with an eight-rayed golden-yellow Philippine sun at the center. Overlapping the Philippine sun is a red equilateral triangle. Inside and at the center of the equilateral triangle is the traditional golden-yellow sea lion (Ultramar) of the Coat-Of-Arms granted to the City of Manila in 1596, on guard with a sword on its right paw, at hilt.

Inside and at the corner of each of the three (3) angles of the equilateral triangle, a five-pointed golden-yellow star to represent Luzon, Visayas, and Mindanao, respectively.

The elements enumerated above are encircled at the outer edge of the blue shield by five-pointed golden-yellow stars, with one point of each star pointing outward on the imaginary radiating center lines, the number of stars conforming to the number of provinces of the Republic of the Philippines at any given time.

Regarding the design of the seal, the executive order states the following:

The Seal of the President of the Philippines shall consist of the Coat-of-Arms of the President of the Philippines, and a white circle around the Coat-of-Arms enclosed by two (2) golden-yellow marginal rings. The white circle shall contain the words SAGISAG NG PANGULO NG PILIPINAS ("Seal of the President of the Philippines") in black letters on the upper arc, the lower arc divided by three (3) five-pointed golden-yellow stars.

Some of the symbols in the arms are derived from the national flag, and retain their meaning. The eight-rayed sun represent the eight provinces placed under martial law in 1896 at the onset of the Philippine Revolution. On the sun there is an equilateral triangle (colored red as opposed to the flag's white), representing liberty, equality, and fraternity, which were ideals of the Revolution. The stars at the corners of the triangle represent the three major island groups of Luzon, Visayas and Mindanao.

At the center of the coat of arms is a sea-lion, which is derived from the coat of arms of the city of Manila granted by King Philip II of Spain in 1596. It has the upper half of a lion, and the lower half and curled tail of a fish. The sea-lion as a heraldic device ultimately comes from the lion on the coat of arms of Castile and León; since the islands were an overseas (ultramar) possession, the lion became a sea lion.

== Usage ==
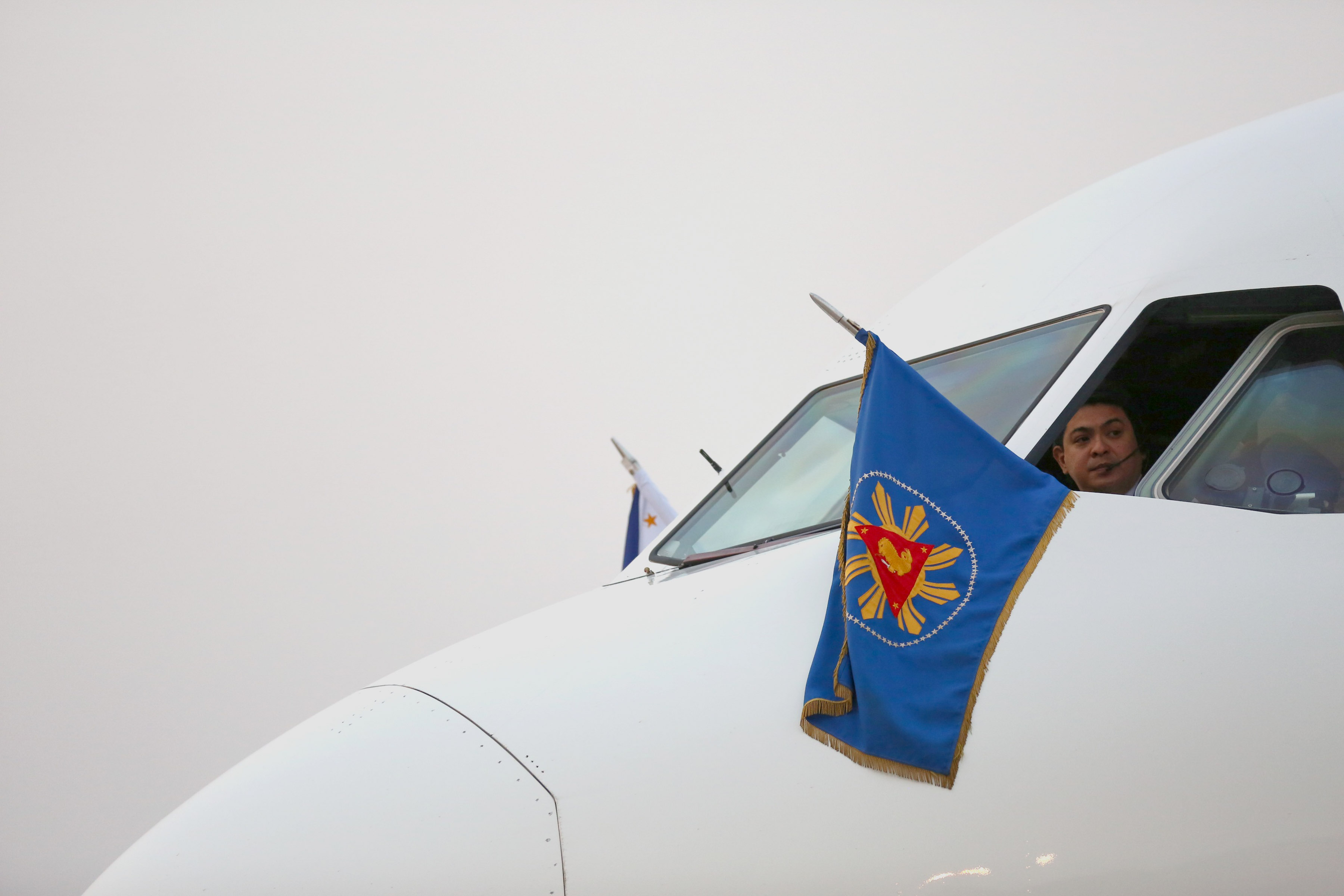
The Presidential Standard, which contains the coat-of-arms, is hoisted outside the cockpit of Philippine Airlines Flight PR001 during President Rodrigo Duterte's official visit to Myanmar in March 2017.

Section 3 of Executive Order No. 310 outlines the following provisions regarding the use of the presidential seal and associated insignia:

Except as used by the President of the Philippines or the Vice President of the Philippines or as may otherwise be provided by law or by Presidential issuance, the manufacture, reproduction, sale, purchase for sale, use, display, or possession in commercial quantity of the Coat-of-Arms, Seal, and/or Flag of the President of the Philippines or of the Vice President of the Philippines, respectively, or any likeness or substantial part thereof, shall be permitted only for the following uses:

- Use in encyclopedias, dictionaries, books, journals, pamphlets, periodicals, or magazines incident to a description or history of coats-of-arms, seals, flags, heraldry, or the Philippine Presidency or Vice Presidency;
- Use in libraries, museums, or educational facilities incident to descriptions or exhibits relating to coats-of-arms, seals, flags, heraldry, or the Philippine Presidency or Vice Presidency;
- Use as an architectural embellishment in libraries, museums, monuments or archives established to house the papers or effects of former or incumbent Presidents or Vice Presidents of the Philippines;
- Use by way of photographic or electronic visual reproduction in pictures, moving pictures, telecasts, or otherwise of bona fide news content;
- Such other uses for exceptional historical, educational, or newsworthy purposes as may be authorized in writing by the Office of Presidential Protocol.

Furthermore, the use of stationery, business cards, identification cards, or any other items containing the Coat-of-Arms, Seal and/or Flag of the President or of the Vice President of the Philippines, respectively, or any likeness or substantial part thereof, by person other than the President of the Vice President of the Philippines is strictly prohibited.

The seal is prominently used on presidential lecterns, the official state car and aircraft, and most notably on official documents and correspondence. The coat of arms (without the encircling title) is displayed on the presidential standard, on the carpet in the Reception Hall of Malacañan Palace, on the official seal of the Presidential Security Command (minus the ring of stars), and in various commemorative coins honoring former presidents.

== History ==
=== The first presidential seal ===
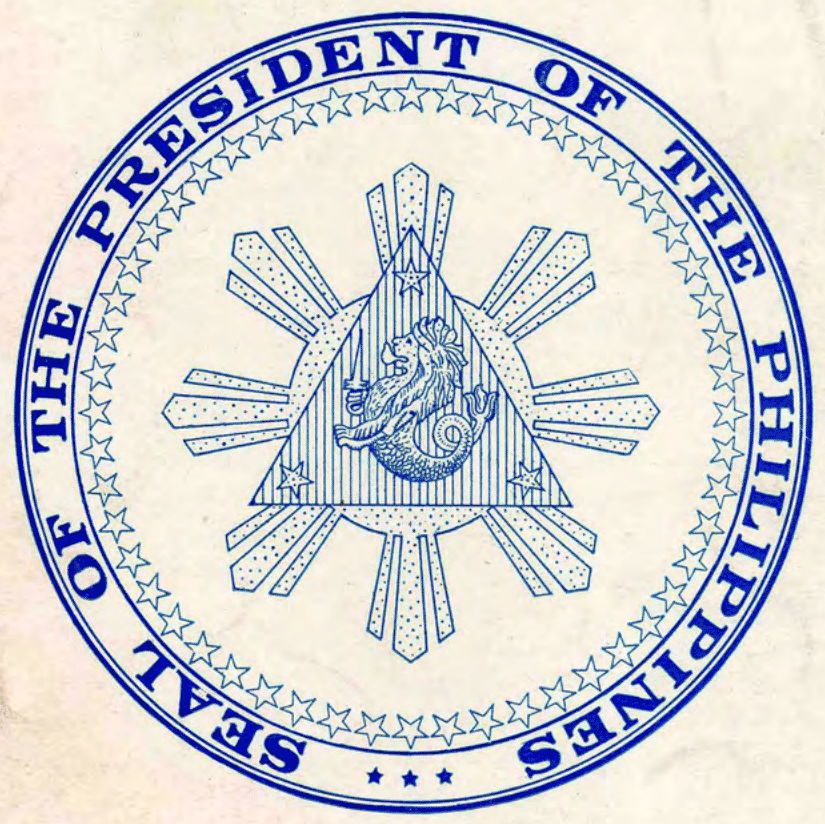
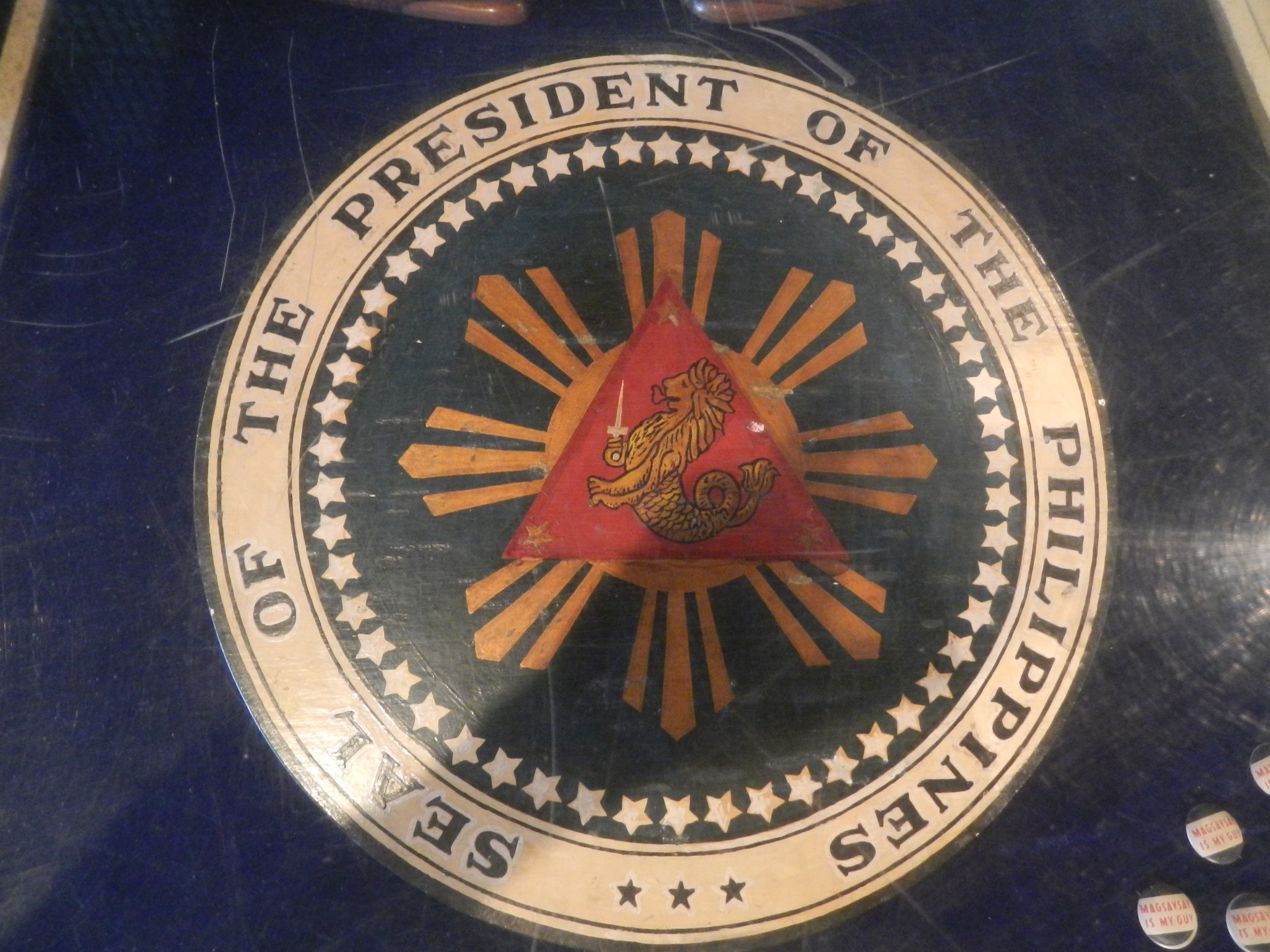
Left: The seal as prescribed by Executive Order No. 457 of 1951; the same design, without the stars, was in use from 1947 to 1951.
Right: The presidential seal in full color as used by President Ramon Magsaysay.

The seal was first used by President Manuel Roxas in 1947. It was designed by Captain Galo B. Ocampo of the Philippine Heraldry Committee, who also designed the coat of arms of the Philippines. The seal was officially prescribed on January 7, 1947, when Executive Order No. 38 of 1947 was signed. It prescribed the coat of arms and seal of the president as:

SECTION 1. The coat of arms of the President of the Philippines shall be of the following design:

SHIELD: The eight-rayed Philippine sun rayonnant in or; on the center an equilateral triangle in gules; over-all the traditional sea lion (Ultramar) of the ancient or original coat of arms of the City of Manila on guard with sword or at hilt; on three points of triangle three mullets in or.

SEC. 2. The seal of the President of the Philippines shall consist of the coat of arms of the President of the Philippines encircled by the words "Seal of the President of the Philippines".

On July 4, 1951, President Elpidio Quirino, signed Executive Order No. 457 into law prescribing that:

...the color of the sun and the sea lion shall be in golden yellow and, additionally provide that the design shall be surrounded by stars forming an amulet in a number equivalent to the number of provinces of the Republic as of July 4, 1951.

At the time of signing, the Philippines had 52 provinces.

=== The 1981 redesign ===
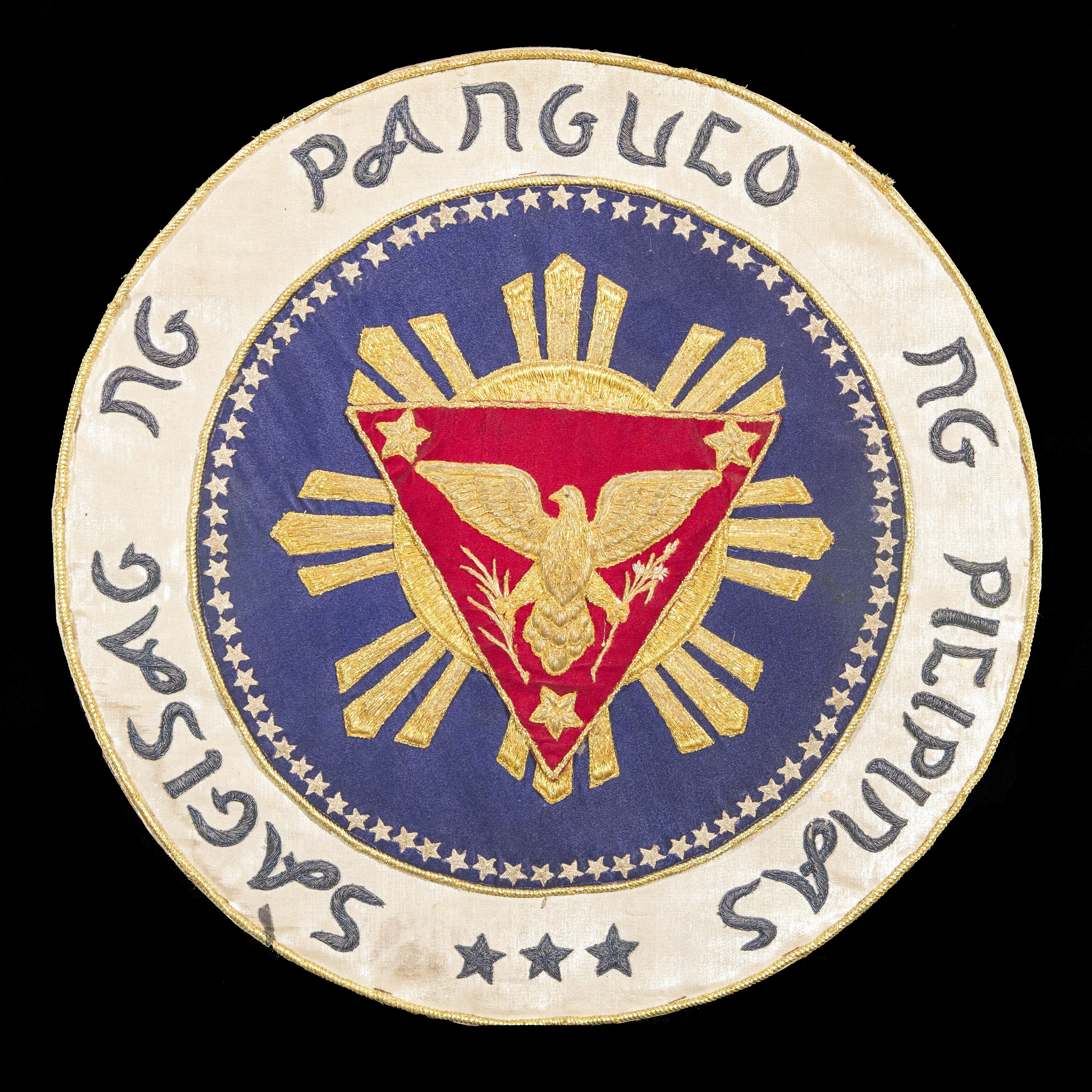
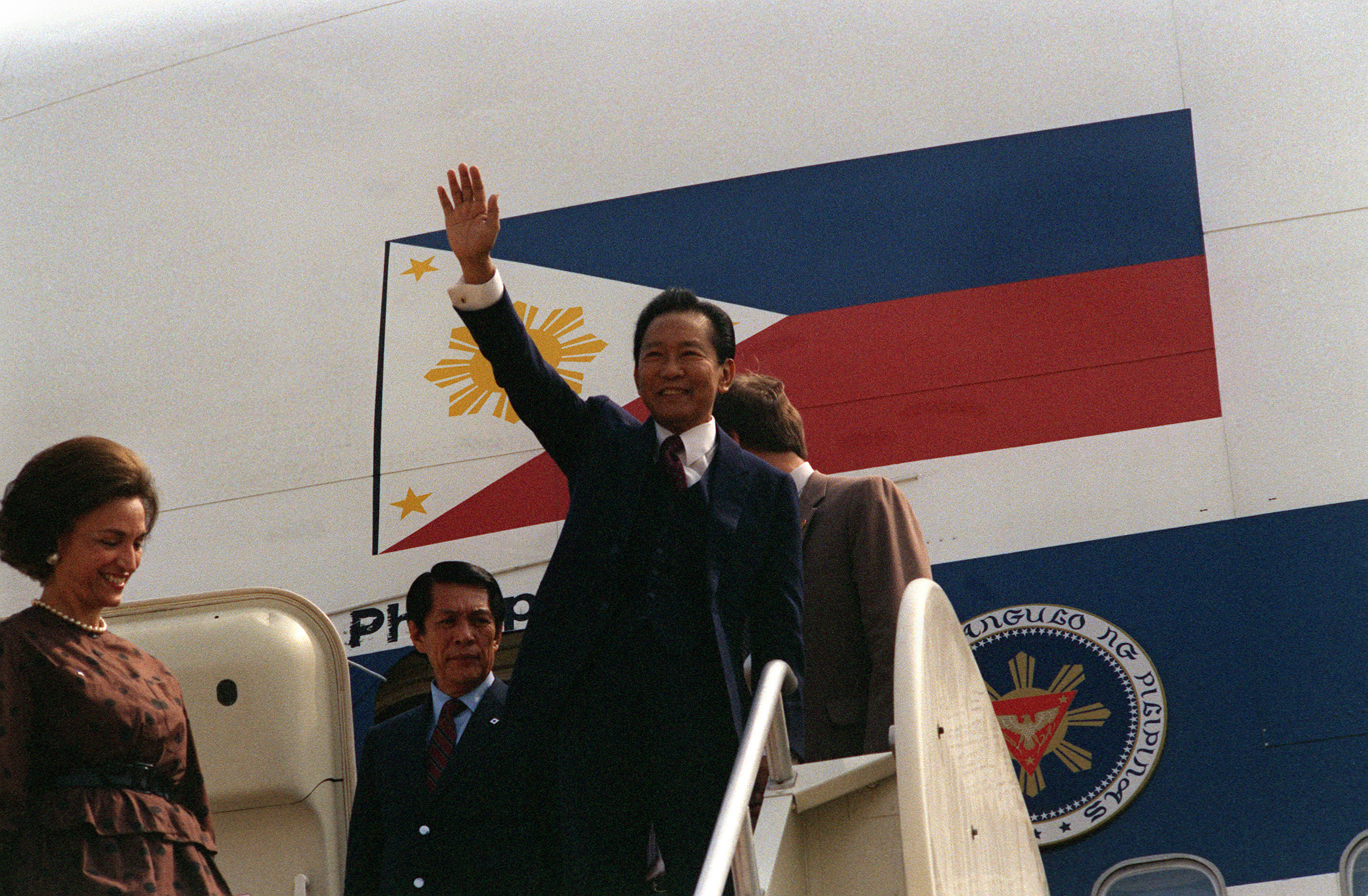
Left: Seal in use from 1981 to 1986.
Right: The 1981 seal on the presidential jet during Ferdinand Marcos' 1983 trip to Washington D.C.

In 1981, President Ferdinand Marcos had the seal redesigned, inverting the triangle and replacing the sea lion with an eagle. The most frequently used seals are those featuring the text in Filipino and in script.

The new design of the coat of arms was adapted into the presidential flag after some time.

=== Restoration of the Ocampo design ===
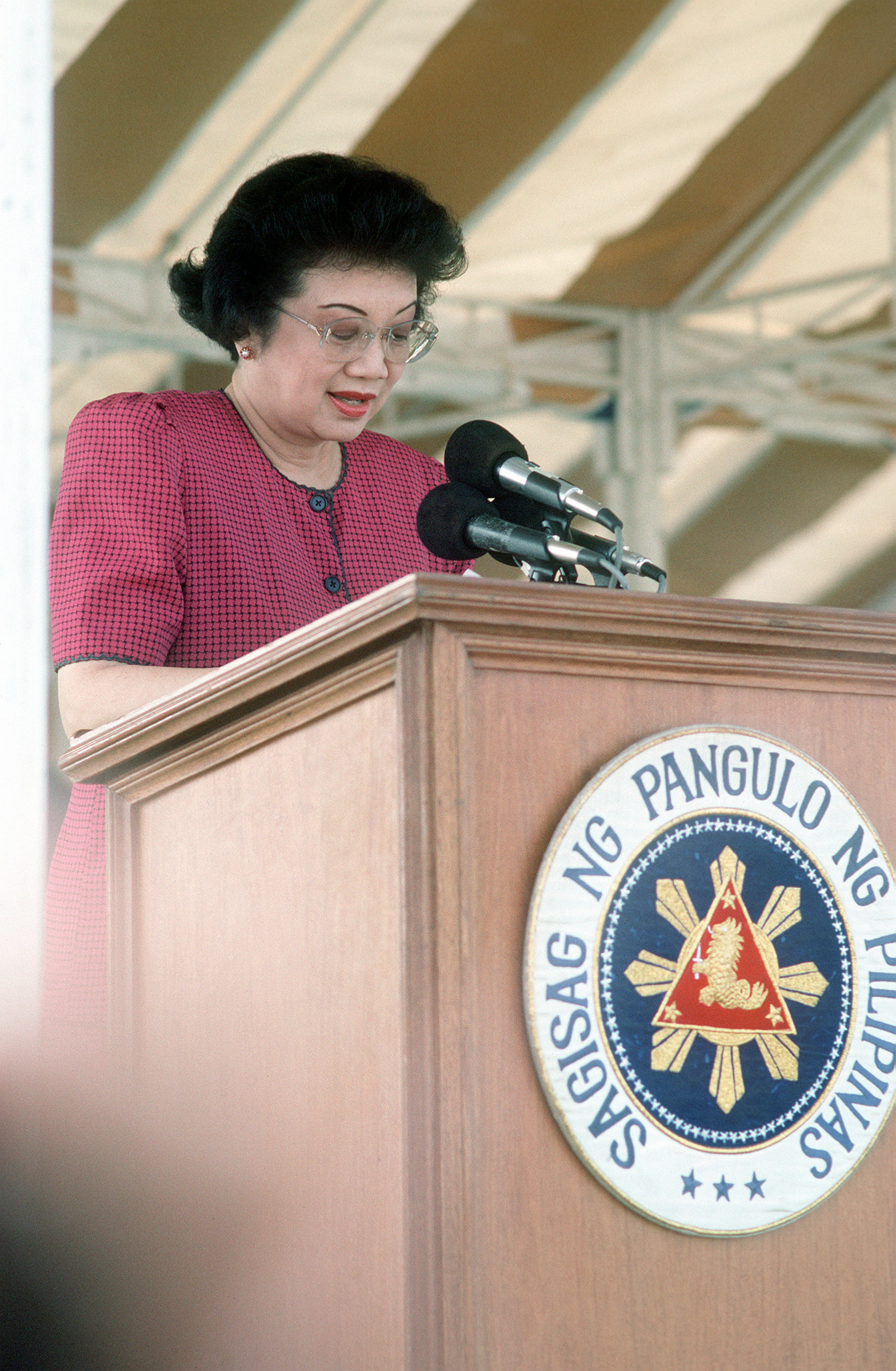
President Corazon Aquino delivering a speech before base workers at a rally at Remy Field, Olongapo City in 1992. Note the use of the pre-1981 design with the text in Filipino.

In the wake of the 1986 People Power Revolution, President Corazon Aquino abolished the use of many symbols of the Marcos regime, including his presidential seal, and restored the 1951 version of the Ocampo design.

On August 27, 1998, President Joseph Estrada signed Executive Order No. 19, amending Executive Order No. 38 of 1947 (as amended) as the number of provinces has increased to 78 and that there is a need to synchronize the number of stars to match the number of provinces at a given time.

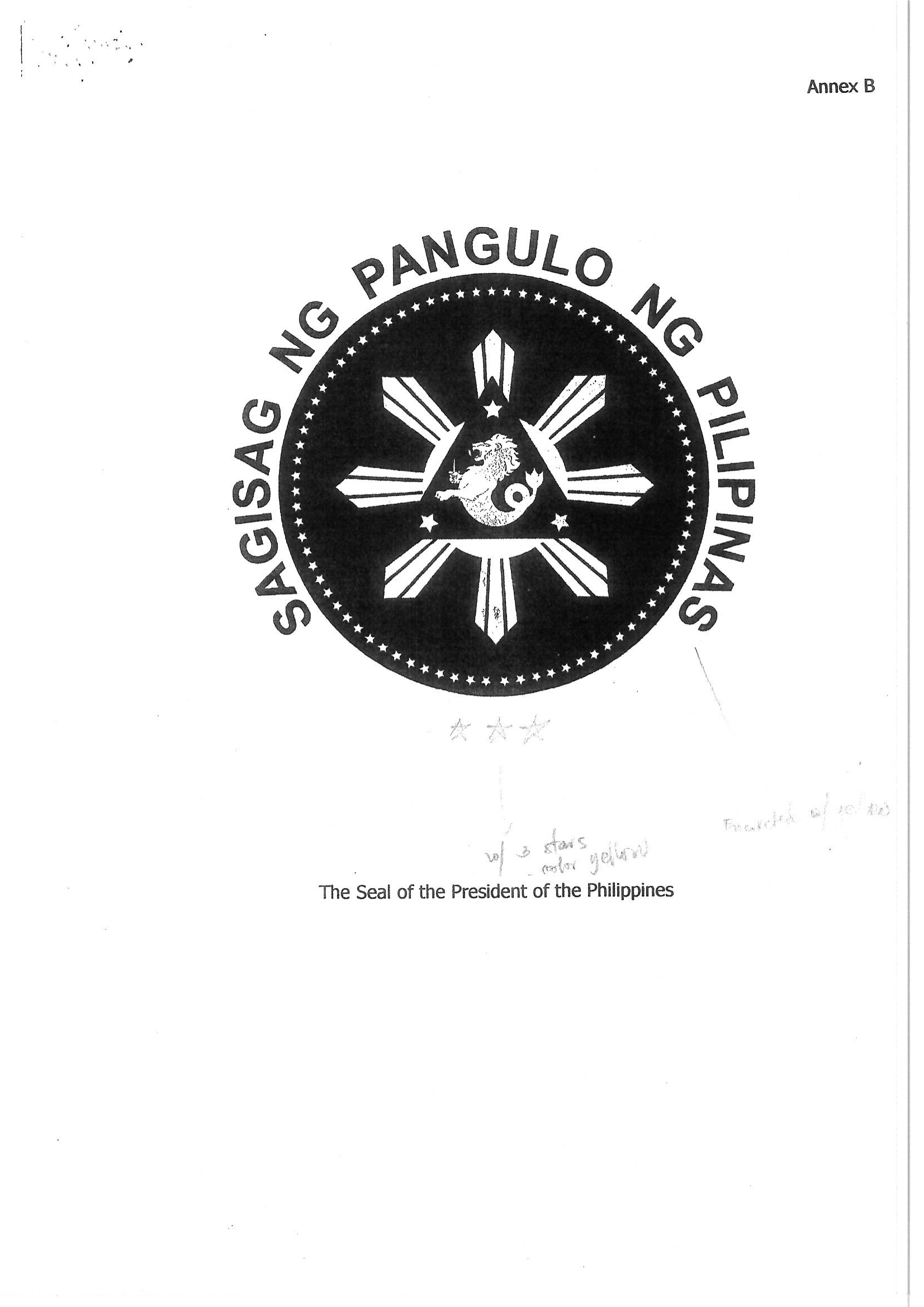
Illustration from the 2004 Executive Order

After Estrada's executive order came into effect, Roxas's executive order read:

Shield: the eight-rayed Philippine sun ravonnant in golden yellow; on the center, an equilateral triangle in gules (red); overall the traditional sea lion of the Coat of Arms granted to the City of Manila in 1596, on guard with sword, or at hilt and one mullet in golden yellow in the corner of each of the three angles of the equilateral triangle: one mullet representing Luzon; one, Visayas; and another, Mindanao. The whole, surrounded by stars in the form of an amulet with one point of each star outward on the imaginary radiating center lines, the number of stars conforming to the number of provinces of the Republic at any given time.

On April 20, 2004, President Gloria Macapagal Arroyo signed Executive Order No. 310, which standardized the seal and its derivative material. The seal as it appears on government documents and property has since been redesigned to conform with the executive order.

As of 2023, the number of provinces in the Philippines increased to 82 with the partition of Maguindanao into Maguindanao del Norte and Maguindanao del Sur. However, official seals currently in use continue to feature the 80-star version of the 2004 design.

== See also ==
- President of the Philippines
- Seal of the vice president of the Philippines
- Coat of arms of the Philippines
- Flag of the president of the Philippines
- Flag of the Philippines
