= Galo Ocampo =

Filipino artist

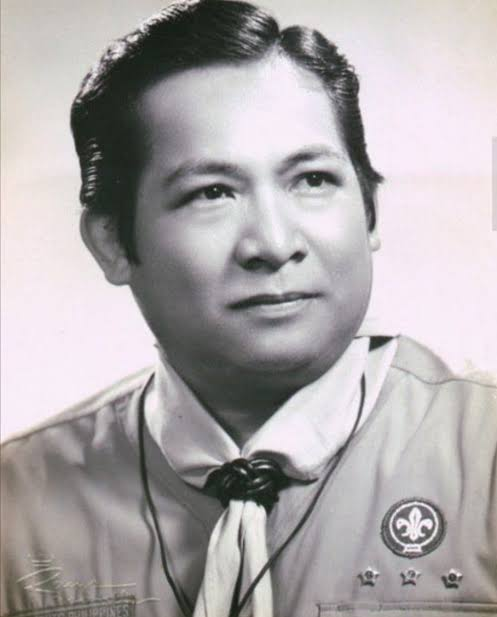
- Born: Galo B. Ocampo; October 16, 1913; Santa Rita, Pampanga, Philippine Islands
- Died: September 12, 1985 (aged 71); Alexandria, Virginia, U.S.
- Education: University of the Philippines in Manila
- Notable work: Coat of arms of the Philippines, Seal of the president of the Philippines
- Movement: Modernism

Galo B. Ocampo (October 16, 1913 – September 12, 1985) was a Filipino artist. He was also the first Filipino to study heraldry and was a member of the International Institute of Genealogy and Heraldry in Madrid. He served as director of the National Museum of the Philippines in the 1960s.

== Early life and education ==
Ocampo was born in Santa Rita, Pampanga. In 1929, he studied Fine Arts at the University of the Philippines in Manila.

== Career ==
A modernist painter, he painted works such as the "Moro Dancer" and the "Igorot Dance". Among his paintings, the "Brown Madonna" garnered attention in 1938 because of its depiction of Jesus and Mary as non-Caucasian, brown Filipinos; It was also said to be "flat and two-dimensional". He, along with Victorio C. Edades and Carlos V. Francisco, painted the mural "Rising Philippines" in the lobby of the Capitol Theater in Manila.

In 1960, he became a member of the President's Documentary Film Committee. He served as the director of the National Museum from 1962 to 1968 and also served as a Secretary of the now-defunct Philippine Heraldry Committee which helped to design various seals of the different cities, municipalities, and provinces of the Philippines. In 1965, Ocampo served as the project director of the 400 Years of Christian Culture Exhibition. After the Reorganization Act of 1972, the committee was abolished (its responsibilities were to be later handled by the National Historical Institute) and Ocampo became the Technical Adviser on Heraldry of the Office of the President.

Among his many works are the stained glass windows in the reconstructed Manila Cathedral and those in the Santo Domingo Church in Quezon City. His most prominent work in heraldry include the coat of arms of the Philippines, the seal of the president, the different coat of arms of the different Archbishops of Manila and the various symbols of state of the Philippines. He designed the insignia of the Order of the Golden Heart among others.

== Later life and death ==
He retired and in 1981 moved to the United States, particularly in Arlington of the Washington area. He died of cardiac arrest September 12, 1985 at the Inova Alexandria Hospital in Virginia.

== Awards and recognition ==
Ocampo received an honorary doctor of philosophy in the humanities from the University of San Carlos in 1967.

In 2015, Ocampo was posthumously awarded the Order of Lakandula with the rank of Marangal na Pinuno for his services to art and heraldry.
