= Casa Hidalgo =

Heritage house in Bataan, Philippines

Don Rafael Enriquez House
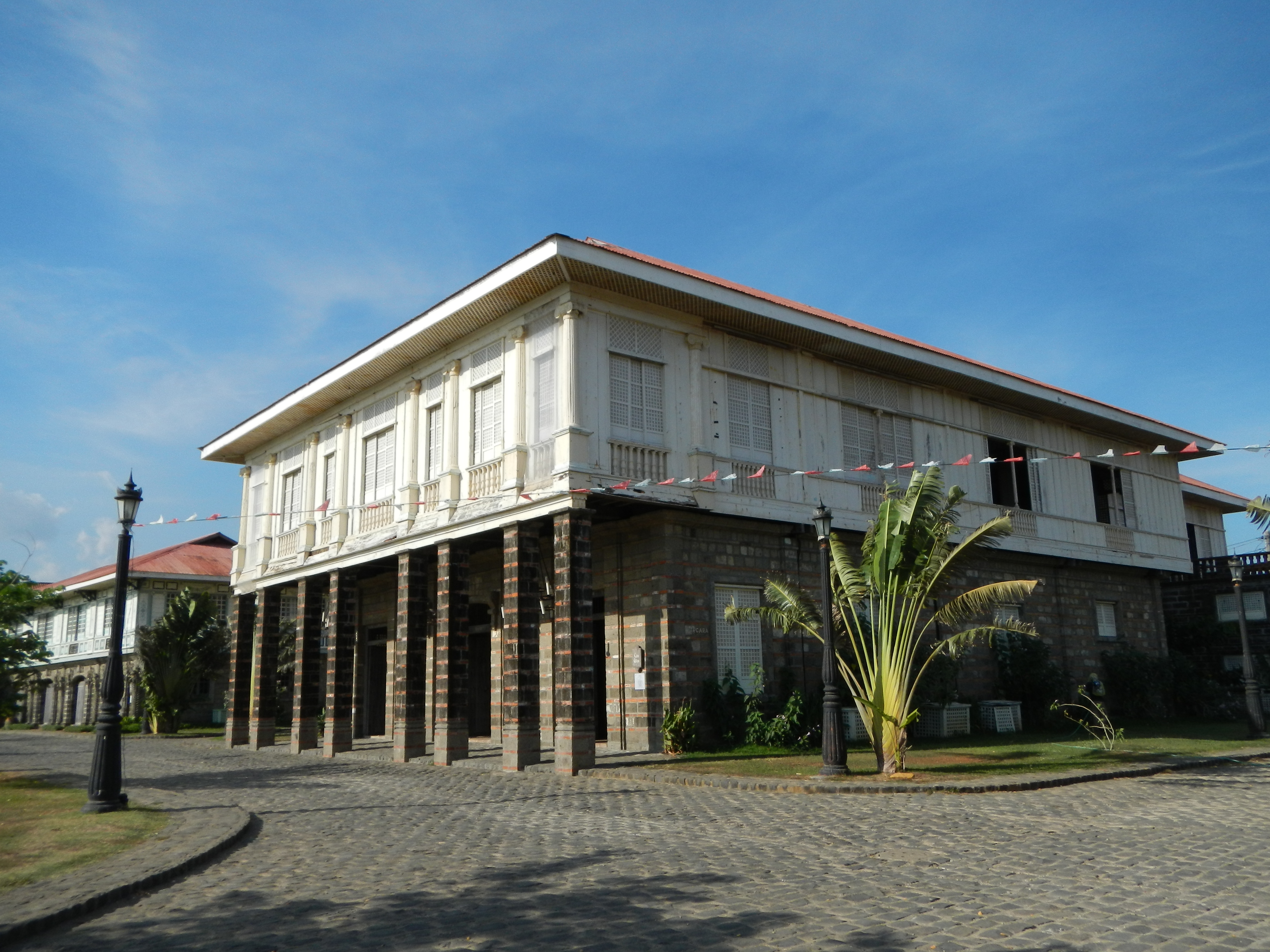
- Interactive map of the Don Rafael Enriquez House area
- Alternative names: Casa Hidalgo

General information
- Type: Single-detached
- Architectural style: Bahay na Bato
- Location: Bagac, Bataan, Philippines
- Coordinates: 14°36′01″N 120°23′14″E
- Construction started: 1867
- Renovated: 2006

Technical details
- Material: Stones and Wood
- Floor count: Two

Design and construction
- Architect: Felix Roxas y Arroyo

The Rafael Enriquez House, also known as Casa Hidalgo, is a heritage house originally located at Quiapo, Manila, owned by Rafael Enriquez, a Spanish peninsular and painter (1850–1937). The house was built in 1867 – one of the first projects of architect Felix Roxas y Arroyo. Some of his notable works were Paterno House and Zamora House in Quiapo, Manila and the 1867 Santo Domingo Church in Intramuros, Manila. However, a carving on king post, stating "1807", indicates that the house was built before Rafael Enriquez occupied the house. This was discovered in 2006 – wherein the house was dismantled and relocated at Las Casas Filipinas de Acuzar, Bagac, Bataan.

== History ==
The Rafael Enriquez House was originally located at the corner of R. Hidalgo Street (formerly Calle San Sebastian) and Callejon Carcer Street at Quiapo, Manila. It was referred as the home of the Enriquez family, descendants of Spanish immigrants who arrived in early 1800s, then settled in Bicol. The house was designed by architect Felix Roxas y Arroyo (1823–1887). He belonged to an influential clan, or buena familia, in Manila. He acquired academic training at the Royal Academy of Fine Arts of San Fernando in Madrid, Spain. One of his works was San Ignacio Church, which metal frameworks were designed and supplied by French engineer, Gustave Eiffel. His company in Manila was represented by Jacobo Zobel, architect Roxas' nephew-in-law.

=== University of the Philippines School of Fine Arts ===
Rafael Enriquez was born at Nueva Caceres (Naga at present) in 1850. He studied at the University of Santo Tomas and got painting courses at Royal Academy of Fine Arts of San Fernando. He moved to Paris in 1879, to London in 1887, and returned to Manila in 1896. He became professor; thus, becoming the first director of the School of Fine Arts at the University of the Philippines in 1909. He served as its director for 17 years until his death in 1937.

The house held classes until 1926, when it moved to its own building on the U.P. campus on Taft Avenue and Padre Faura Street (now the Supreme Court of the Philippines). Some of its alumni while it was at the original Enriquez house were Fabián de la Rosa, Fernando Amorsolo, and Guillermo Tolentino.

== Architectural features ==
The house resembles a Spanish Colonial architectural style. Its ground floor was made of large adobe stones while the second floor was made of hardwood. The lower part of the house consists of series of adobe posts with Ionic columns covering the sidewalk in front of it. The arcaded sidewalk was caused by a mandate from the city government of Manila after the 1863 earthquake. This feature was also reflected on structures built along San Fernando street in Binondo, San Sebastian (now R. Hidalgo street) in Quiapo and Calzada de Iris (part of the present C.M. Recto) in Sampaloc.

The central bay of the ground floor is a carriage way, leading to stables at the rear. About halfway in were the main stairs leading up to a landing and hen doubling back. Both sides of it were mezzanines, or entresuelo, partly elevated rooms used before as offices, servant's quarters, and storage rooms. Eventually, these spaces became sculpture area, classrooms, and studios when the structure became a school. Beside the main staircase were to two principal drawing rooms, gallery, or loggia, and living rooms on the ground floor. The staircase has double Ionic pillars in gold paint finish – same with the gallery, which contains 8 Ionic shafts. The gallery was enclosed; with seven capiz windows. The flooring of the ground floor was made out of native marble tiles. A second sala, smaller than the gallery, opens up to a series of drawing rooms inside.

On the second floor was the foyer, or caida, connecting the main corridor above the carriageway. The main sala, overlooking the street, was located on the one side while a terrace, or azotea, was located on the other end of the corridor. Bedrooms are situated on both sides of the corridor. An aljibe or cistern serves as rainwater collector from the roofs.

== Present condition ==
Despite surviving the World War II, the house was vacated by its owners, selling it during the 1970s. The ground floor became commercial establishments while the large rooms of the second floor were partitioned into lodgings. Also, it housed a panciteria, a dormitory, a bowling alley, and a movie theater. Later owners sold it to Jose L. Acuzar, chairman of New San Jose Builders, Inc., who transferred it to Bagac, Bataan.

=== Restoration of the Rafael Enriquez House ===
The original architectural plans were missing; thus, the restoration of the house was conducted by analyzing its existing state. Its layout was similar to mansions within Manila such as the Goldenberg and Teus houses in San Miguel. The rear of the house had been destroyed by fire and the surviving front half was occupied by numerous families and shops before the restoration work.

The following were conducted during the restoration process: replaced wooden floor planks; patched walls and ceilings; removal of the grand staircase, relocated into the former driveway and constructed one steep flight out of lower-grade wood; division of large spaces into rooms at the second floor with 8-foot high lawanit panels; scraping of excess paint layers at the Ionic capitals; and removal of later additions of tile and cement at the granite blocks, or piedra china, at the ground level
