= Casa Bizantina =

Historic house museum in Bataan, Philippines

Don Lorenzo del Rosario House
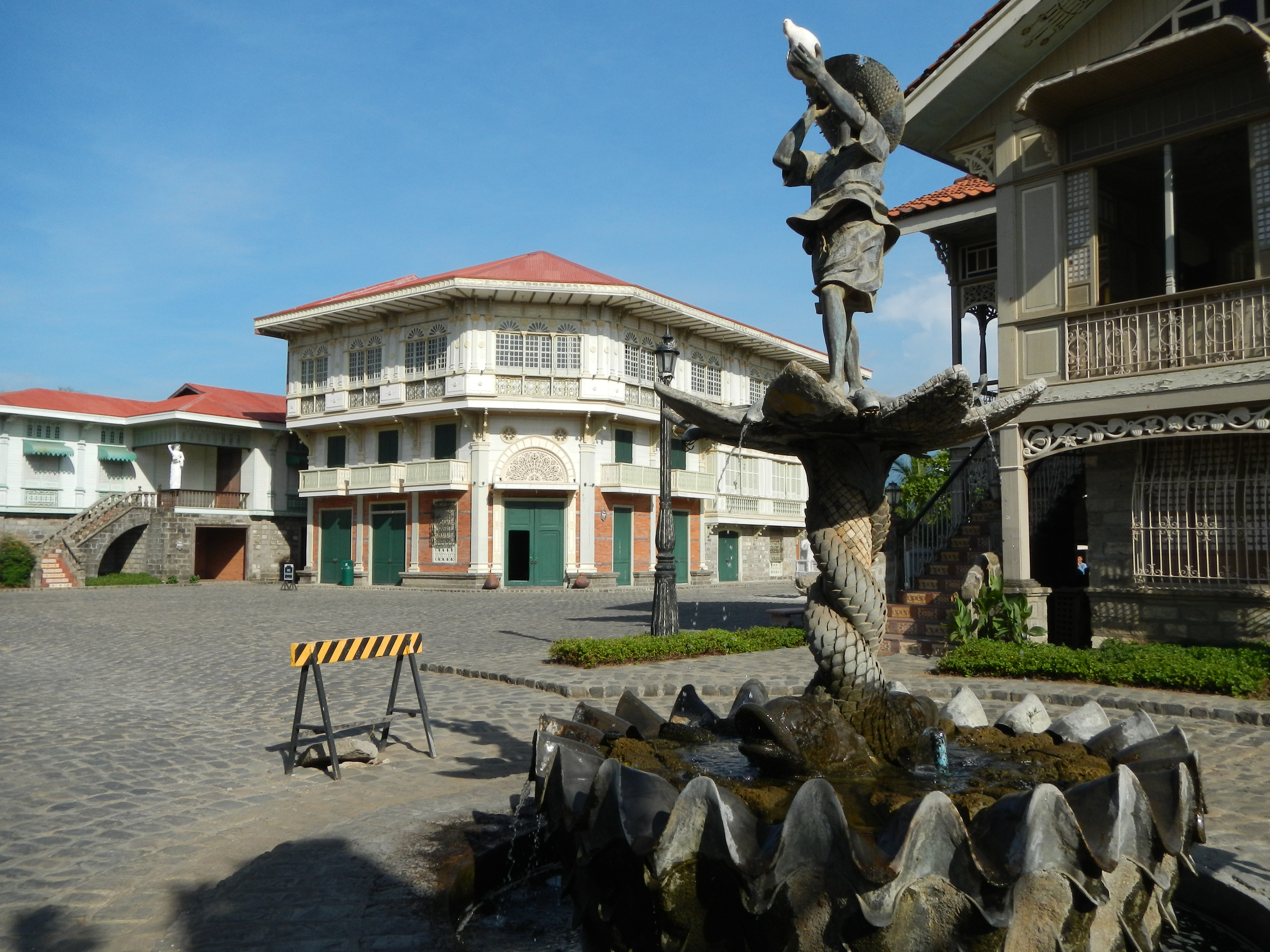
- View of the Don Lorenzo del Rosario House, or Casa Bizantina from the plaza of Las Casas Filipinas de Acuzar in Bagac, Bataan
- Interactive map of the Don Lorenzo del Rosario House area
- Alternative names: Casa Bizantina

General information
- Type: Single-detached
- Architectural style: Bahay na bato
- Location: Bagac, Bataan, Philippines
- Coordinates: 14°35′57″N 120°23′15″E
- Construction started: 1890
- Renovated: 2009

Technical details
- Material: Stones and Wood
- Floor count: Three

Design and construction
- Architect: Joan Josep Jose Hervas y Arizmendi

The Don Lorenzo del Rosario House, also known as Casa Bizantina, is a heritage house museum originally located at San Nicolas, Manila. It was transferred and reconstructed in 2009 at Las Casas Filipinas de Acuzar, Bagac, Bataan. It was designed by the Catalan architect Joan Josep Jose Hervas y Arizmendi, in 1890. It is the only existing building designed by Arizmendi in the Philippines. In addition, it was cited by Tribune magazine in 1939 despite its neglected state.

== History ==
Spanish army captain Esteban de Peñarubia modernized the Binondo area, especially along Calles Fundicion, Ylang Ylang, Aceiteros (now M. de Santos St.) and Jaboneros, after a major fire incident in 1863. It encouraged several businesses such as metal casting (particularly of bells), oil extraction (perfume essences and cooking oil) and soap making. The ground level of the houses built serve as commercial spaces while the upper floors serve as residential spaces. One of which was the Don Lorenzo del Rosario House, owned by Don Lorenzo del Rosario, a signer of the Malolos Constitution. In 1868, Peñarubia was appointed military governor of Abra.

=== Juan José Hervás y Arizmendi ===
Juan José Hervás y Arizmendi (1851–1912) was a Spanish architect, born in Barcelona, Spain. He received his degree in 1879 and became the municipal architect, or arquitecto municipal, of Sitges and Tortosa in Spain and in Manila, Philippines, from 1892 to 1898. He married Isabel Sebastià y Silva from Iloilo (Philippines), with whom he had seven children, all born in Manila.

One of his works were private residences such as Casa Pérez-Samanillo (Circulo Ecuestre at present) in 1910, for which he was awarded the 1911 Barcelona City Council Prize, owned by the influential Pérez-Samanillo family, former Manila residents. They owned the Edificio Perez-Samanillo in Escolta, Manila. His other works include Hotel del Oriente and La Insular Fábrica de Tabacos y Cigarrillos.

== Architectural features ==
Casa Bizantina is a bahay na bato. Don Lorenzo del Rosario House is a three-storey mixed-used structure used as commercial and residential space. It has been called Casa Bizantina because of its Byzantine ornamentation such as a half-moon opening above the large entrance with grill works, arches above the windows of the third floor, engaged columns, and appliqued carvings. However, the house reflects more of the Neo-Mudejar or Spanish-Moorish architectural style. A balcony, or mirador, crowned the roof above the interior's stairs with turned balusters. The stairs leads up to the second and third floors and provides access to both wings of the house.

The house was built with a chamfered corner, in compliance with the municipal building regulations before. The streets at the commercial concentrations at Binondo and San Nicolas districts in Manila were narrow; thus, corner buildings were mandated to be built with a chamfer or chaflan in 1869. This regulation led to the creation of eight-sided open spaces, or plazoletas, at every street corner.

== Present condition ==
The house was occupied by a succession of tenants during the 20th century. It was the first home of the University of Manila in 1914. The nearby community decayed after World War II and the land reclamation for the North Harbor. The old houses became tenements and were torn down to make way for commercial buildings. Casa Bizantina was in miserable condition by 2000. After eight years, the house was declared structurally unsound. Despite its condition, more than 20 families still occupy the house. In 2009, the Don Lorenzo del Rosario House was sold, dismantled, and brought to Bagac, Bataan.
