= Casa Jaen I =

Historic house museum in Bataan, Philippines

Don Hilarion Esquivel House
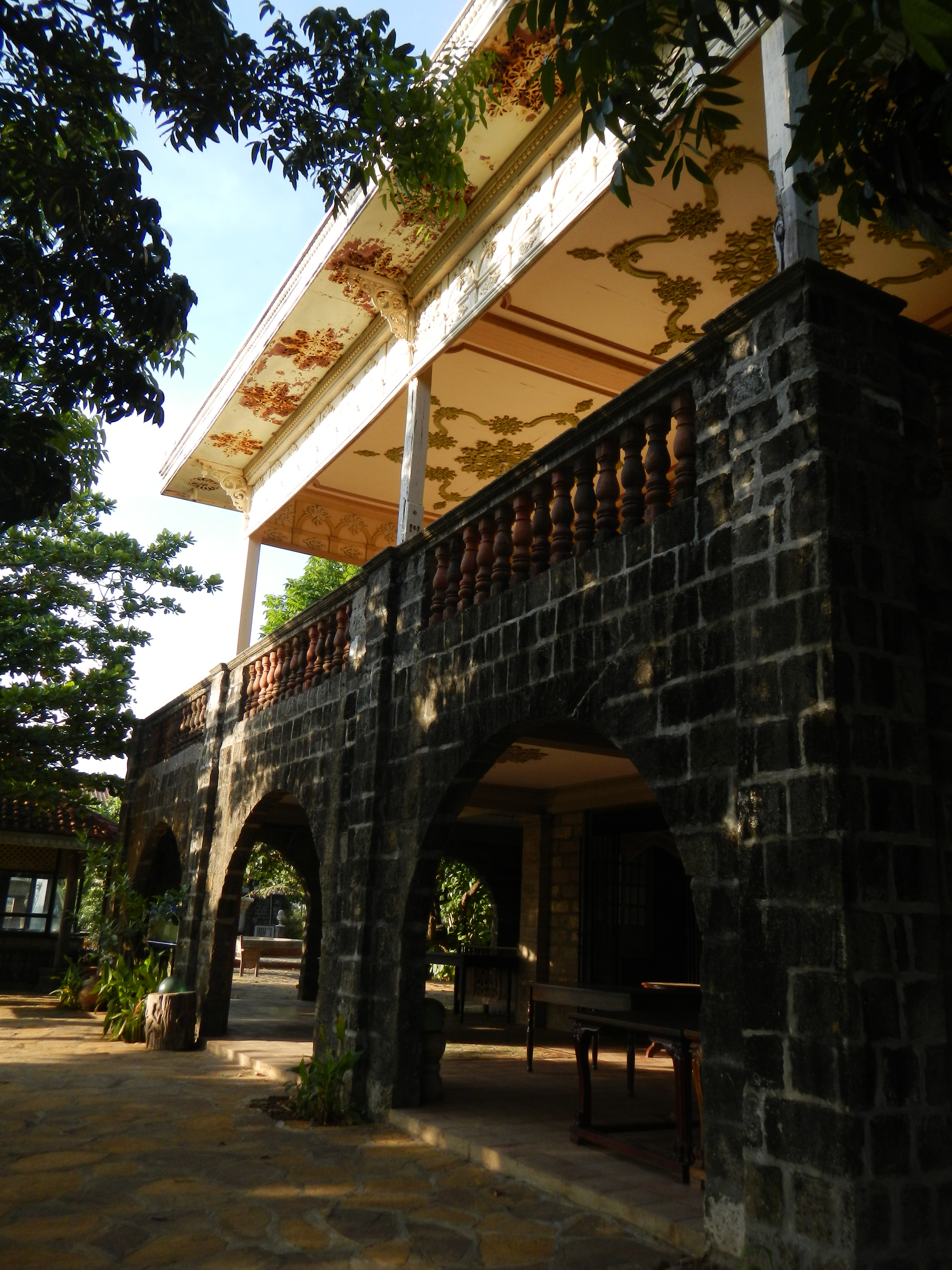
- Interactive map of the Don Hilarion Esquivel House area
- Alternative names: Casa Jaen I

General information
- Status: Single
- Type: Single-detached
- Architectural style: Bahay na Bato
- Location: Bagac, Bataan, Philippines
- Coordinates: 14°35′59″N 120°23′12″E
- Construction started: 1900s
- Renovated: 2007

Technical details
- Material: Stones and Wood
- Floor count: Two

Design and construction
- Architect: Don Hilarion Esquivel

The Don Hilarion Esquivel House, also known as Casa Jaen I, is a heritage house museum originally located at Jaen, Nueva Ecija built during the 1900s. Being the second house of the Esquivel family at Jaen, Nueva Ecija, it served as the venue for the homecoming of his son, Emmanuel Frias Esquivel, who studied at the United States. Their first house, which is also located at the same municipality, was built in 1890. At present, the house was re-located at Las Casas Filipinas de Acuzar, Bagac, Bataan.

It won the House Beautiful Award in 1917 by the Sunday Tribune. Other houses that have won the award were the El Nido, or Eugene Arthur Perkins residence in 1927 and La Casona, or Jacobo Zobel Mansion in 1928 - all designed by Andres Luna de San Pedro.

== Architectural features ==
The ground floor of the Don Hilarion Esquivel house were lined with stone flooring while the flooring of the second floor was made of wooden planks. The terrace, or azotea, was located at the rear portion of the house. Its windows were made of large glass panels, instead from the traditional capiz windows. Also, it has a protruding front room - similar to houses built during the American Colonial Period such as the Baldomero Aguinaldo Shrine in Kawit, Cavite. Below the front room are the porch, or porte cochere, and the main entrance.

The exterior and interior wall portions of the house still bears bullet holes - testifying to the history of the occupants before. Esquivels were one of the most influential families in Nueva Ecija. The upper walls of the interior partitions have decorative wooden panels, which improves the air circulation inside. The stairs possesses an elaborate design - leading up to the foyer, or caida, and a corridor, which links the living room, or sala, at the front of the house and the dining room, or comedor, at the rear side. The bedrooms are situated at the sides.
