= Las Casas Filipinas de Acuzar =

Seaside heritage resort in Bataan, Philippines

- Logo

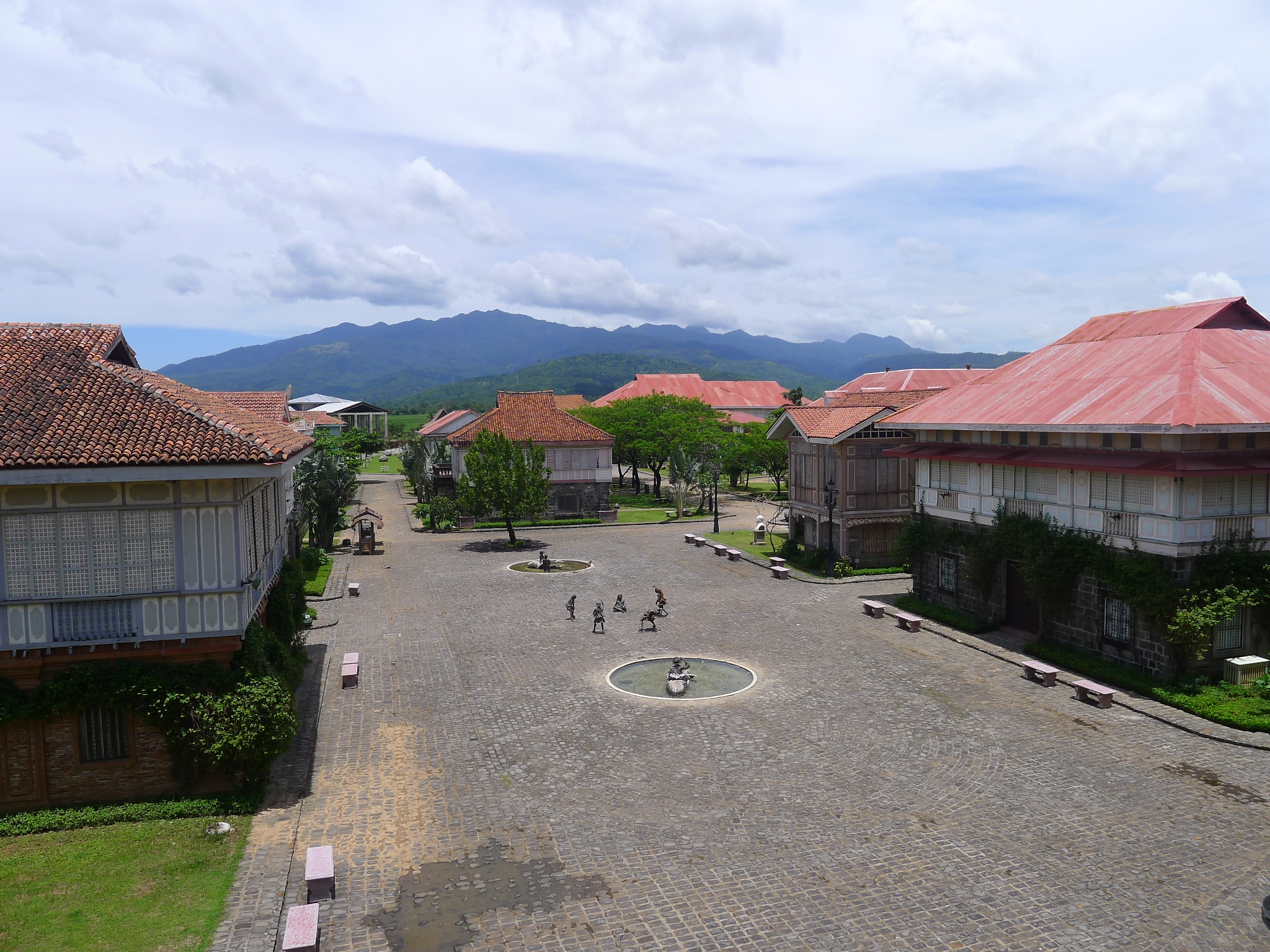
- View of the hotel grounds
- Interactive map of Las Casas Filipinas de Acuzar
- Location: Bagac, Bataan, Philippines
- Coordinates: 14°36′09.6″N 120°23′06.9″E
- Status: Operating
- Opened: March 2010; 16 years ago
- Operated by: Marivent Resort Hotel Inc.
- Theme: Filipino heritage
- Area: 400 hectares (4.0 km^{2})
- Website: lascasasfilipinas.com

Las Casas Filipinas de Acuzar (Spanish for "Acuzar's Philippine Houses") is a beach resort, hotel, convention center and heritage destination in Bagac, Bataan, Philippines.

The complex is known for transplanting heritage houses from elsewhere, a contentious heritage conservation practice. Conservationists argue that the house should have been restored on site while proponents of Las Casas argue that they are preserving structures which would have been neglected in their original locations.

== History ==
Jose Acuzar, the owner of New San Jose Builders, Inc., started to rebuild Spanish colonial-era mansions in Bagac in 2003. In March 2010, the area was opened to the public as Las Casas Filipinas de Acuzar, although the area was already being used as taping location of the GMA Network series Zorro ten months earlier, in March 2009. It was placed under the management of Genesis Hotels and Resorts Corporation.

Las Casas Filipinas temporarily closed in early 2020 due to community quarantine measures imposed in response to the COVID-19 pandemic, but reopened in July 2020.

In November 2021, it was named the "Best Historic Hotel in Asia and the Pacific" by the Historic Hotels of America, which cited it as one of the hotels that "best celebrate its history in the guest experience and provide exceptional customer hospitality and service."

Aside from Zorro, it was also used as a filming location of Goyo: Ang Batang Heneral, Heneral Luna, Maria Clara at Ibarra, FPJ's Ang Probinsyano, Widow's War and the upcoming movie The Last Resort.

== Features ==
Las Casas Filipinas covers an area of around 400 hectares (990 acres) in Bagac, Bataan. As of January 2021, its lodging consists of 128 guest rooms and 63 "elite casas."

=== Heritage houses ===
The main attraction of Las Casas Filipinas de Acuzar is its heritage houses, which were transplanted from outside Bagac, Bataan. The houses were disassembled at their original location and reconstructed inside the premises of Las Casas Filipinas. Damaged structures were meticulously reconstructed by a team of skilled artisans and laborers using the original source of raw materials and construction methods of the time. This included using old methods for manufacturing components like Spanish mission tiles, bricks, grills, mosaics, stone and wood carvings, and so on.

Houses included in Las Casas Filipinas are evaluated for their historical, cultural, and architectural value. Most structures date back to the Spanish colonial era, but some were built later, such as the Casa Lubao, which was built in 1920 during the American era. The heritage park also includes a torogan, a Maranao royal clan house from Lanao in Mindanao.

Among the notable houses transplanted to the heritage park are Casa Bizantina, Casa Hidalgo, Casa Jaen I, and Casa Unisan.

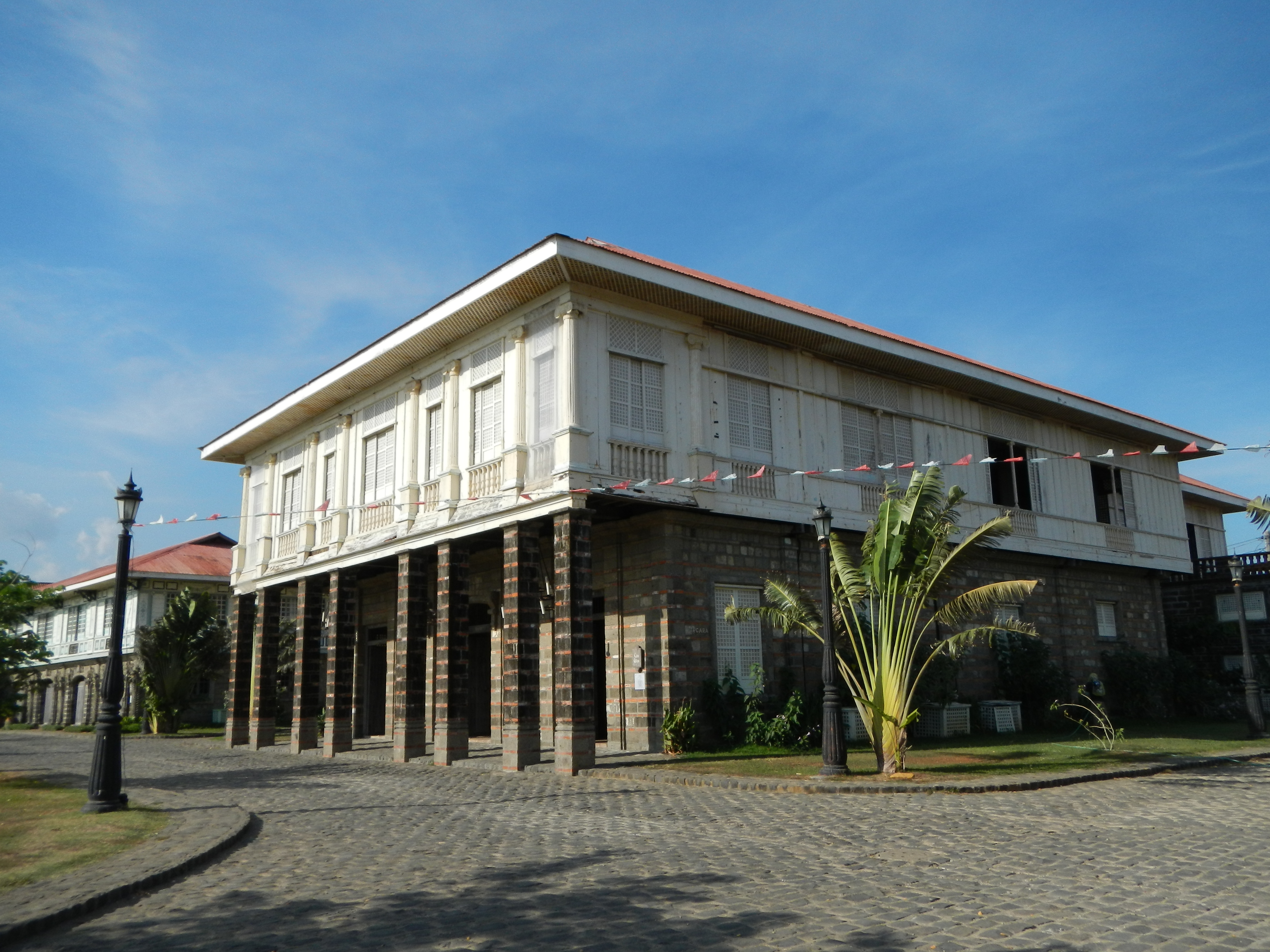
Casa Hidalgo

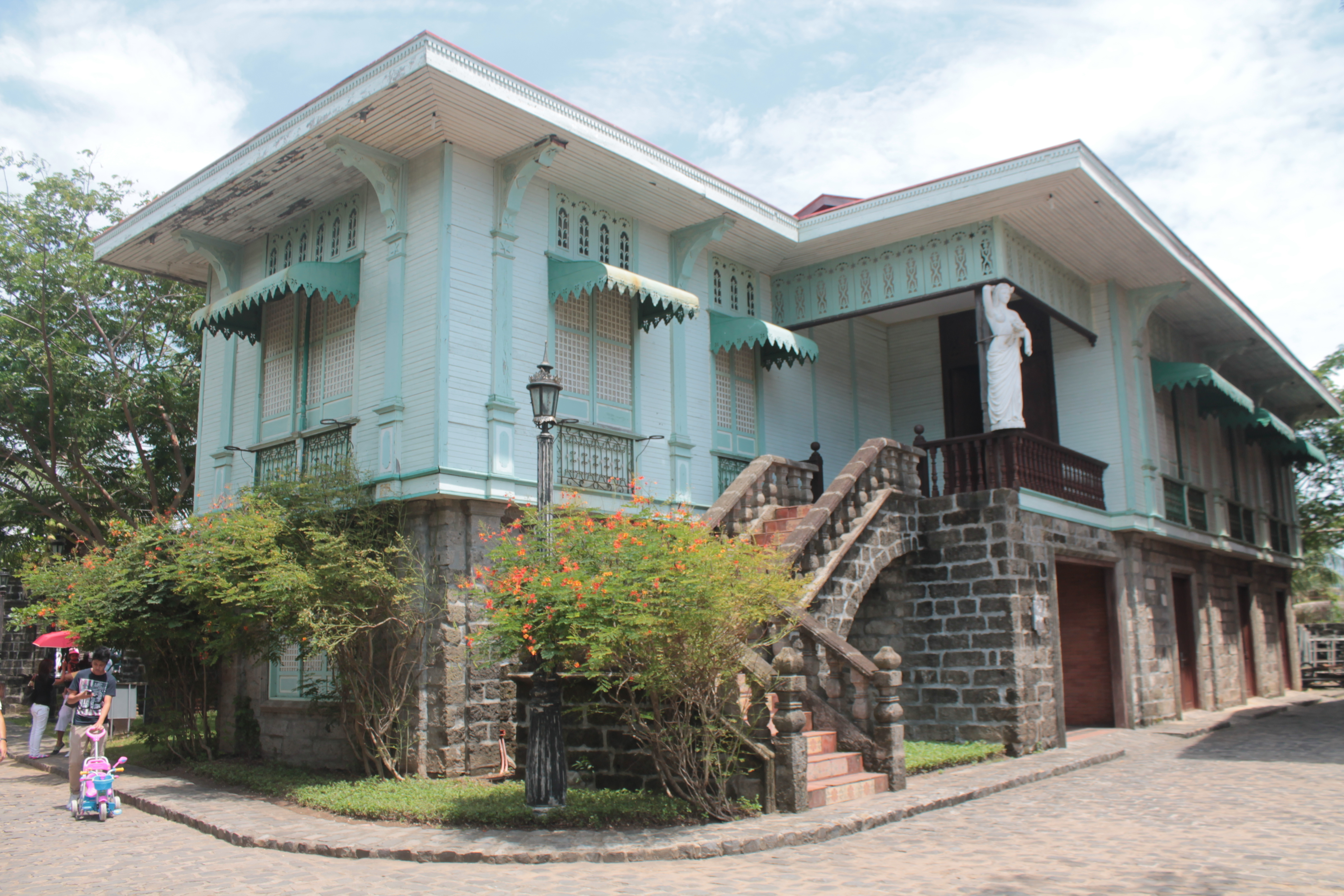
Casa San Miguel

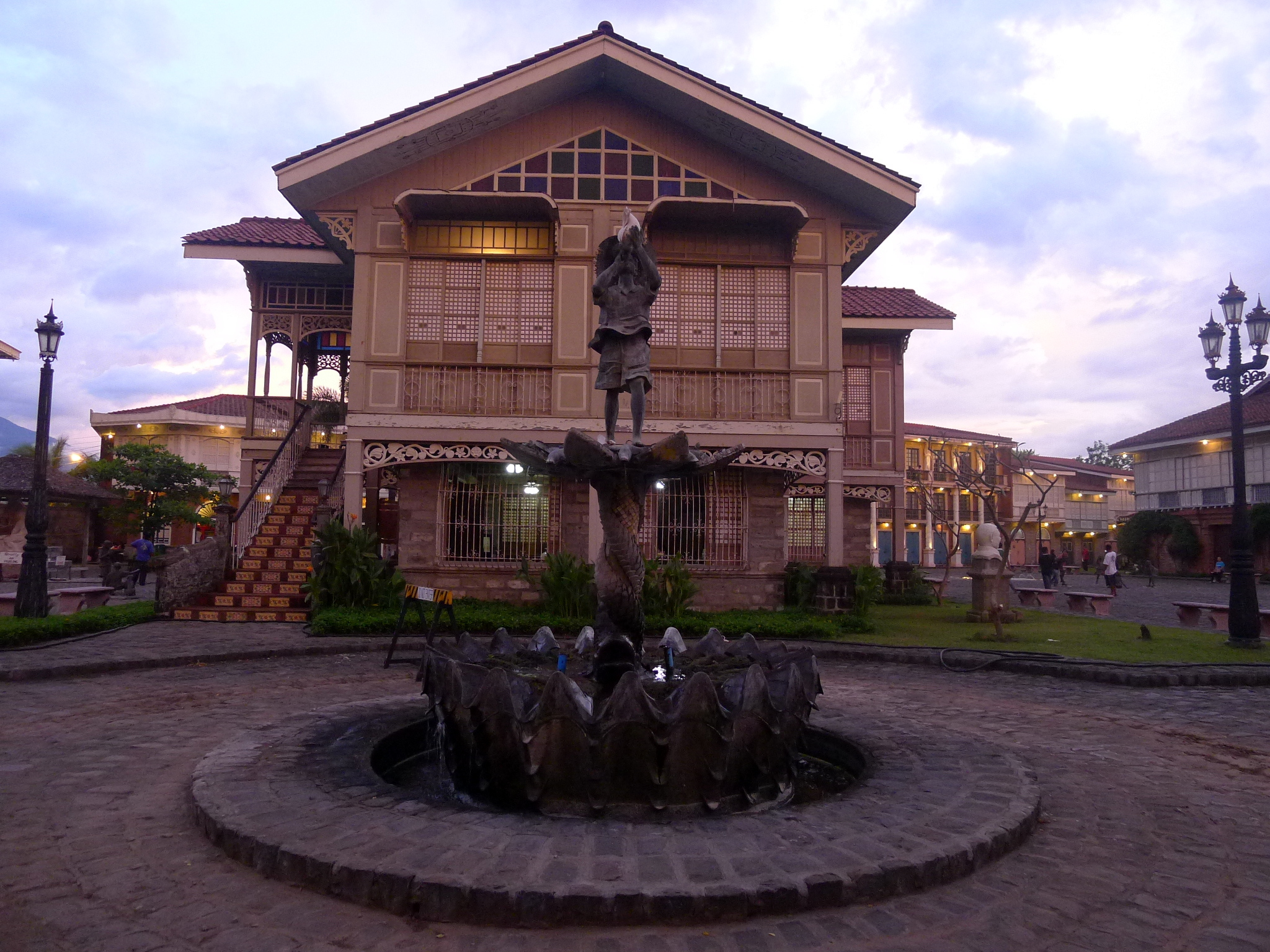
Casa Mexico

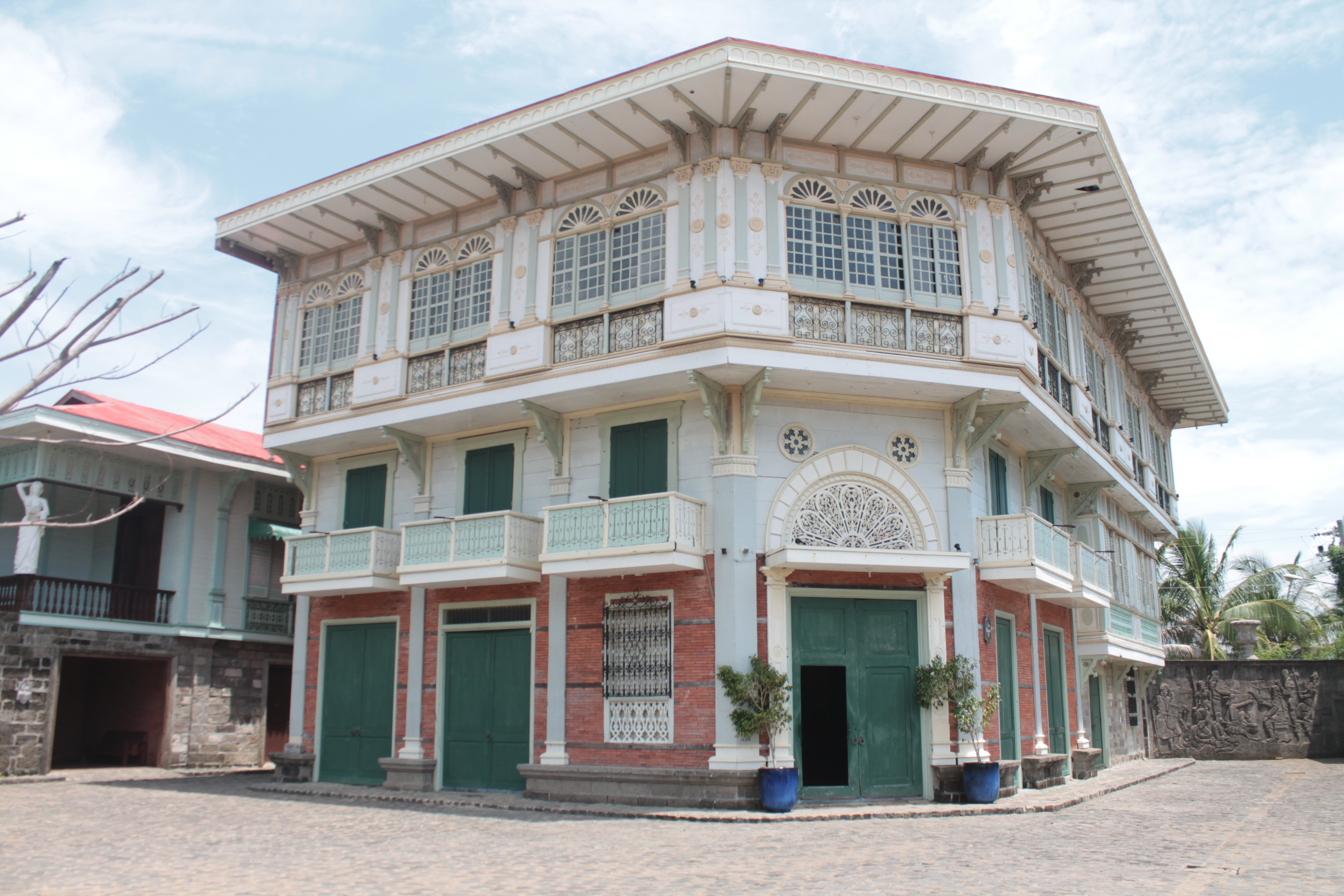
Casa Byzantina

=== Other structures ===
Las Casas Filipinas de Acuzar also hosts a small church known as the Sanctuario de San Jose. Other features include the Napiya Spa, a swimming pool. The Tulay ni Lola Basyang is a bridge that crosses the Umagol River and is a replica of the old Puente de España in Manila.

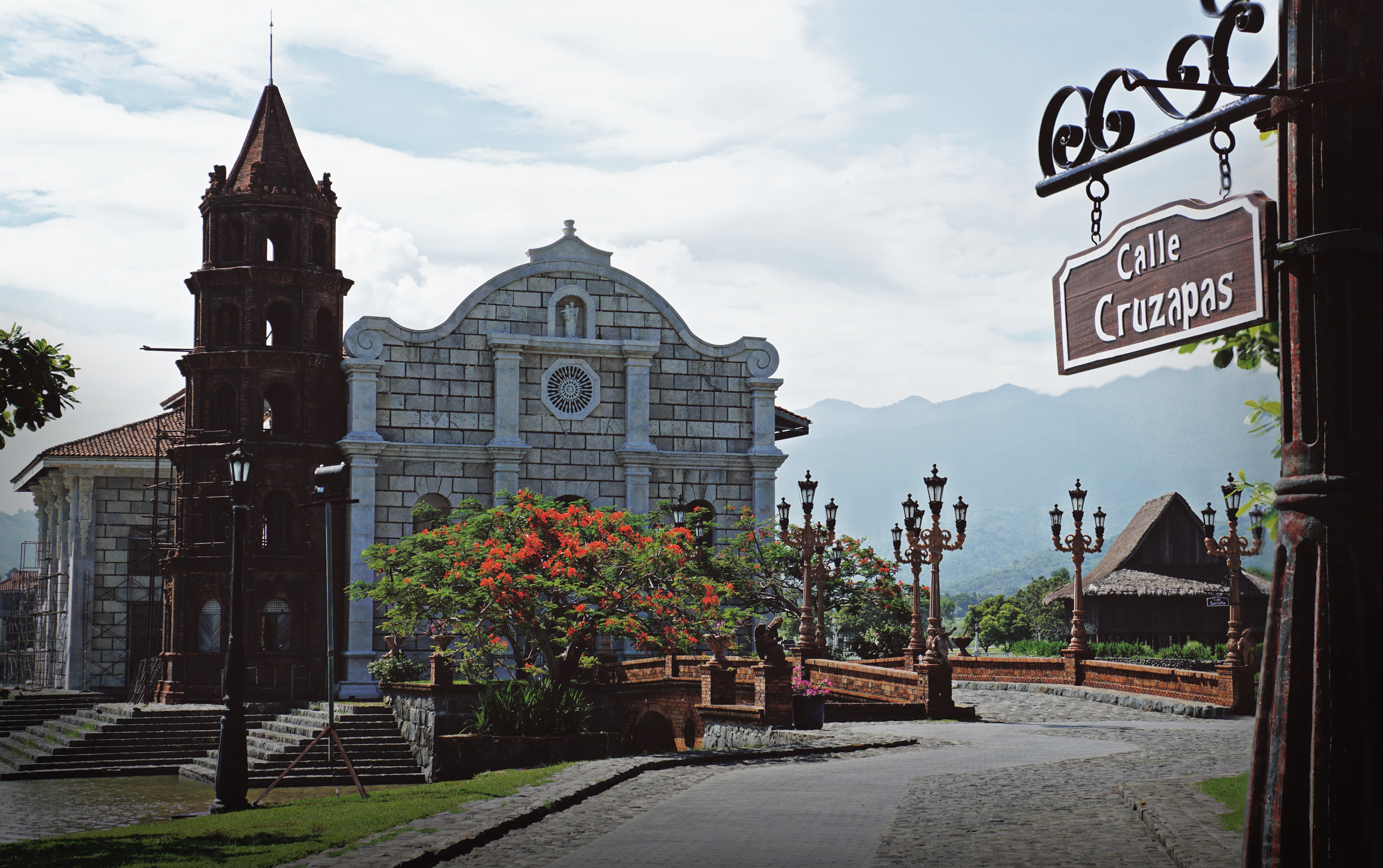
Sanctuario de San Jose

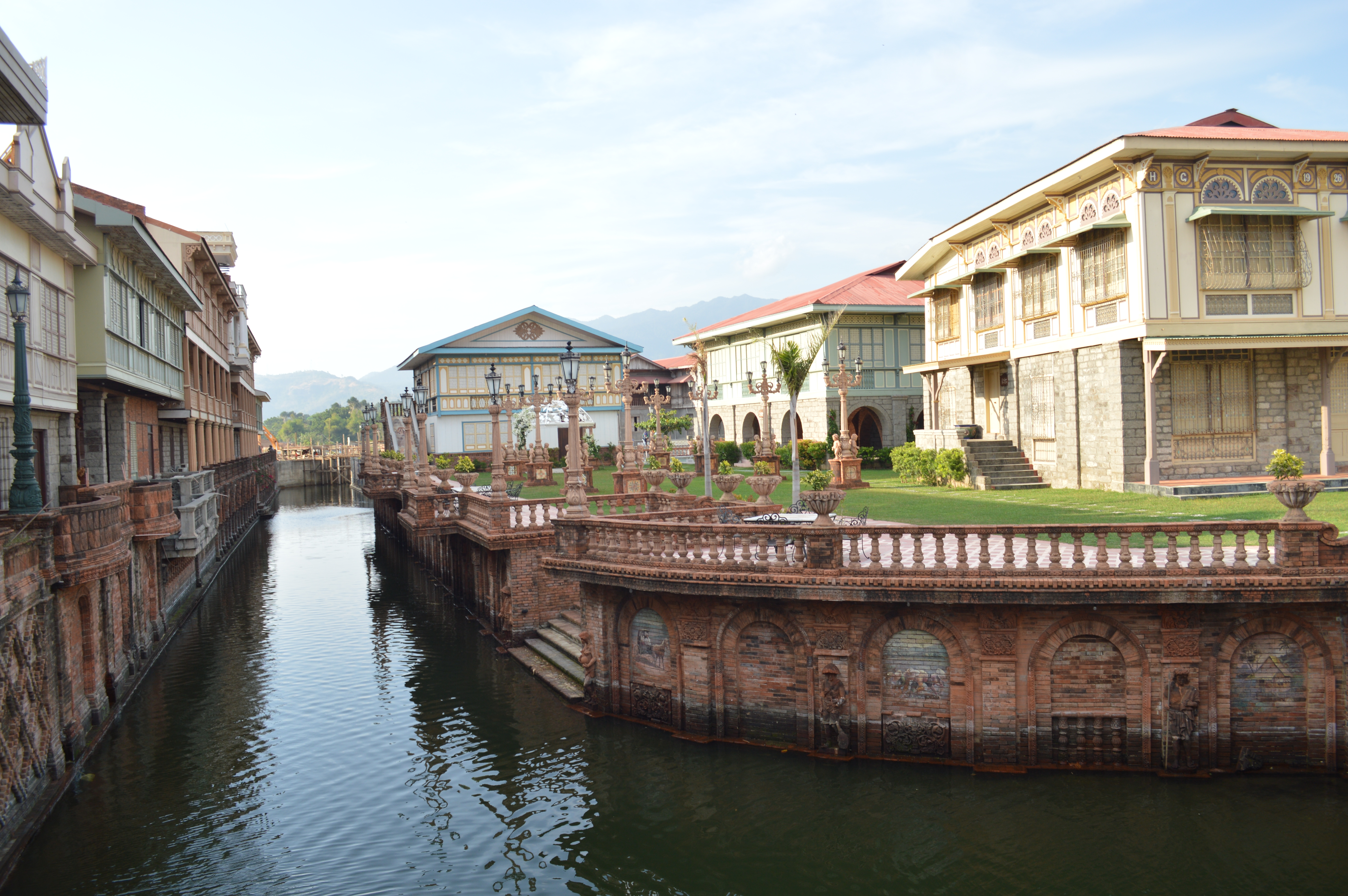
Rows of houses lining Umagol River

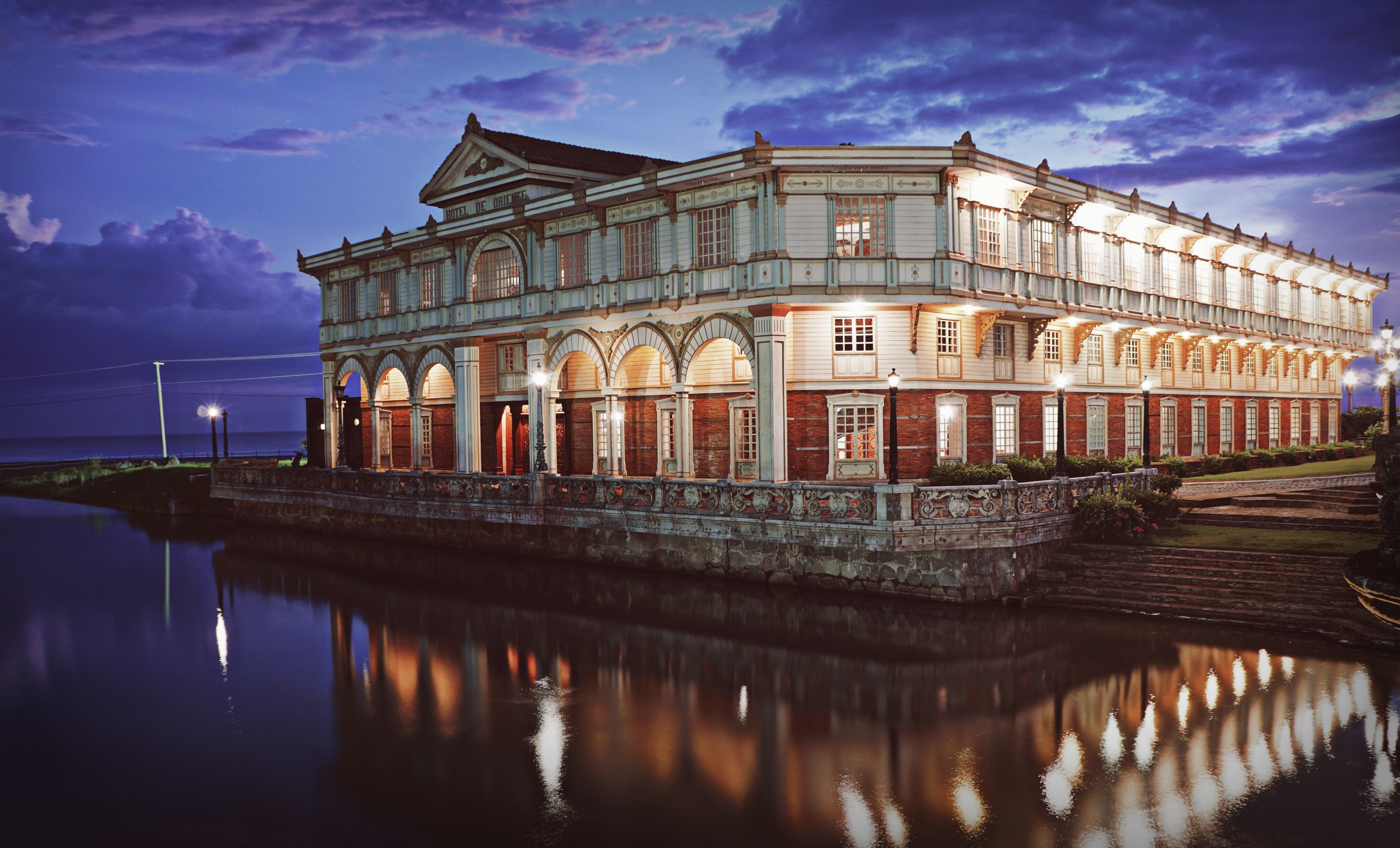
Hotel de Oriente

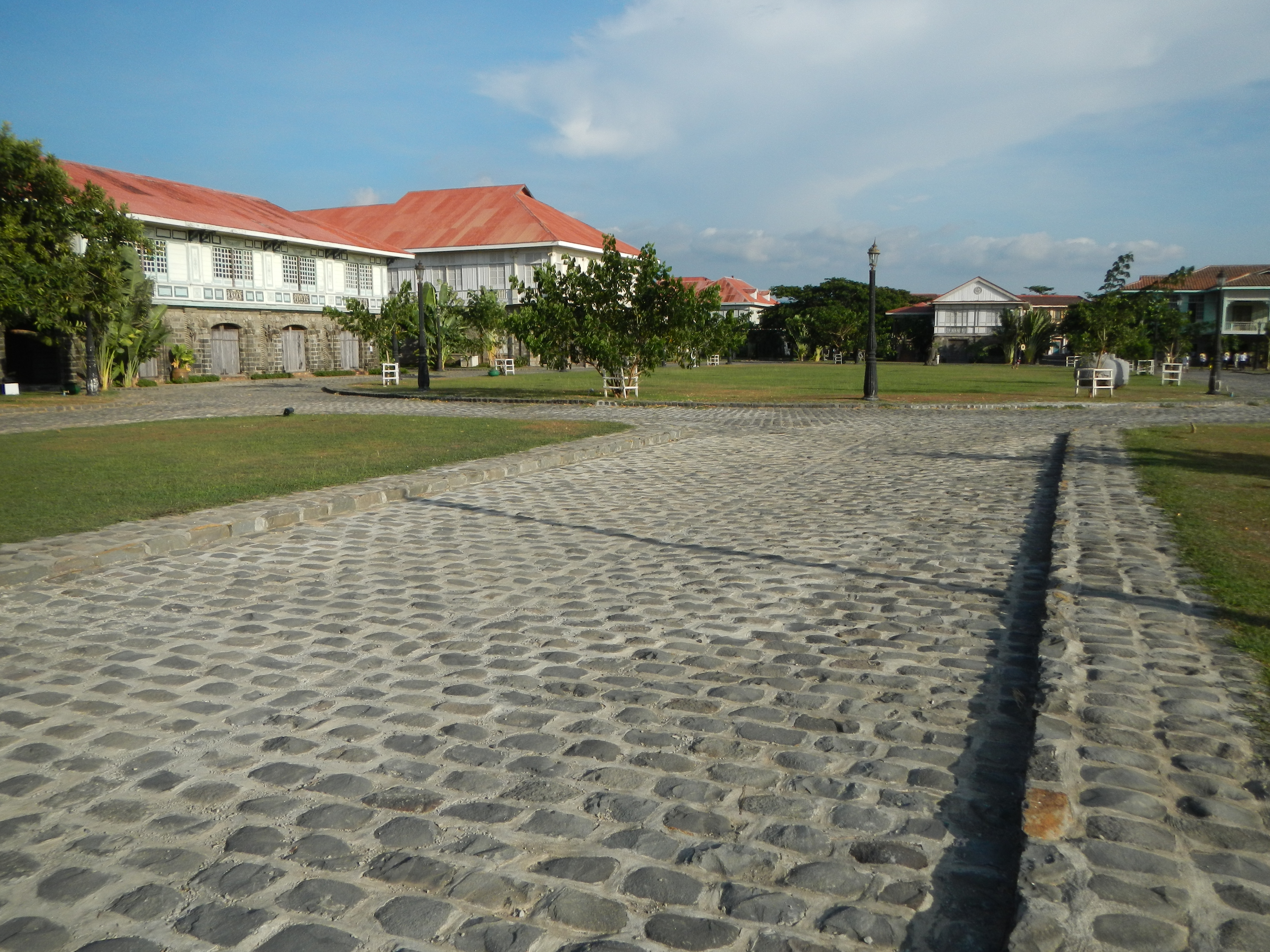
Cobblestone-covered street

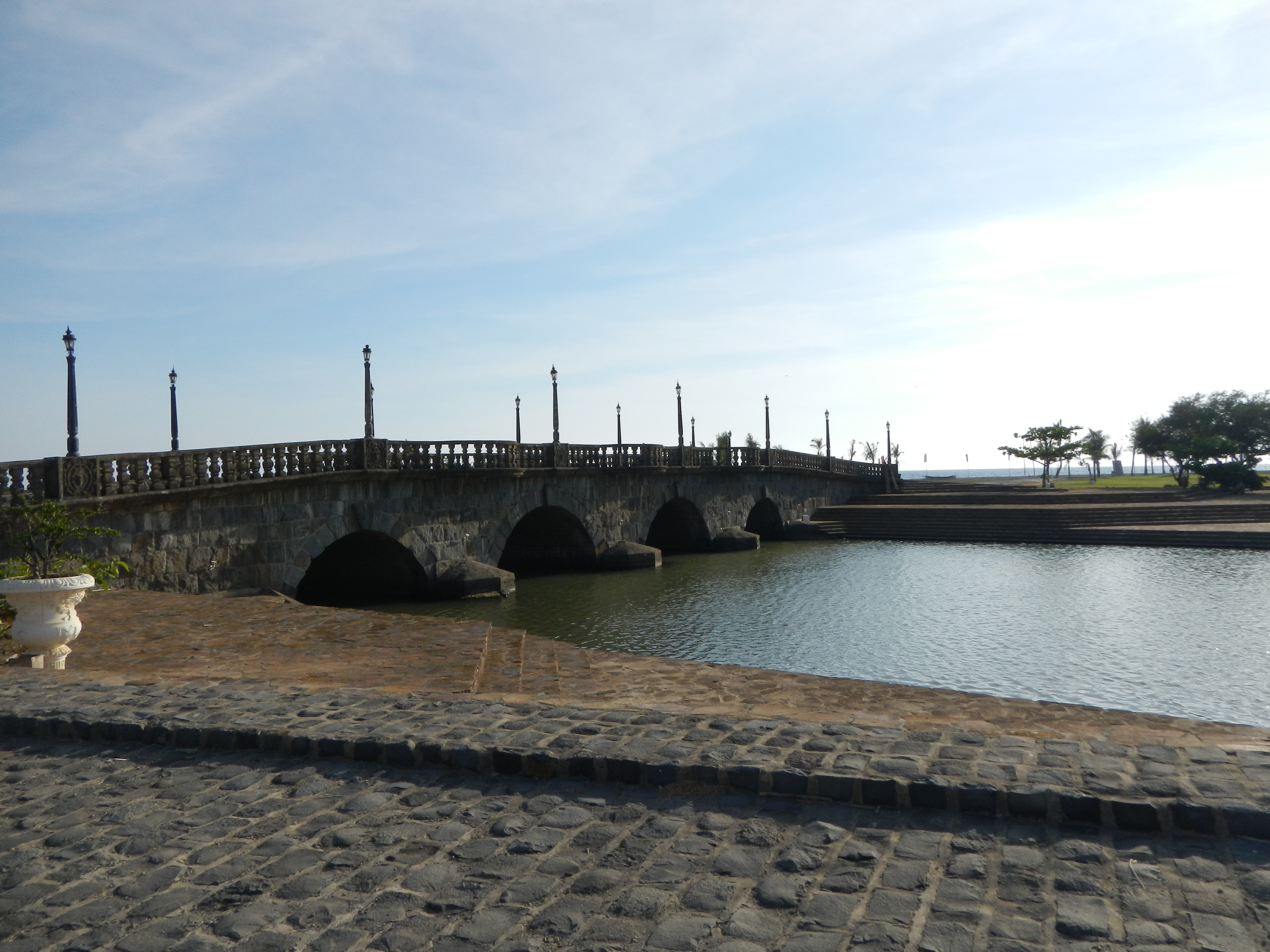
Tulay ni Lola Basyang

== Heritage conservation ==
The method of heritage conservation by transplanting historic houses from elsewhere to the Las Casas Filipinas has been contentious among conservationists, as they believed their original communities could have benefited from the structures had they been restored on site.

The heritage park's founder, Jose Acuzar, stated this was done to save the structures. Heritage conservation gets little-to-no funding from the government, and the structures were neglected and decaying in their original communities. Acuzar, a draftsman and real-estate magnate, was inspired to do the project after traveling around Europe and witnessing preservation efforts on heritage architecture. His son being an art history graduate also played a part.

In 2021, the Department of Tourism, under Secretary Bernadette Romulo-Puyat, lauded the heritage park for its preservation efforts.
