= Boracay Mansion =

- Interactive map of the Boracay Mansion area

General information
- Type: Residence
- Location: New Manila, Quezon City, 100 11th Street, Barangay Mariana, Quezon City, Philippines
- Coordinates: 14.62275°N 121.0331682°E
- Completed: Never Completed
- Demolished: 2013
- Owner: St. Peter Holdings (1999-2005; legal owner); Joseph Estrada (c. 1999-2005; de facto owner); Quezon City Government (2005-2013)

The Boracay Mansion was an unfinished residential building in the northern part of the New Manila neighbourhood of Quezon City, Philippines. Formerly owned by Joseph Estrada, the 13th President of the Philippines and former Mayor of Manila, the house was reportedly built for his mistress, former film actress Laarni Enríquez.

The structure has since been demolished, with the Quezon City Reception House built on the site.

== Background ==
Reported by the Philippine Center for Investigative Journalism as one of President Joseph Estrada's 17 palatial properties, it became one of the focal points of his impeachment trial at the Philippine Senate in 2001.

The property occupied by the mansion was bought by St. Peter's Holdings Corp. on October 1, 1999, but the owner of the firm, Jose Yulo, has stated that the real owner of the mansion was Jaime Dichaves, a friend of Estrada. Estrada denied owning the mansion, saying he only borrowed the property from Dichaves.

The mansion occupied 7,145 square meters (76,910 sq ft) of two adjacent lots in the historic and posh neighborhood of New Manila in Quezon City. The moniker "Boracay Mansion" was inspired by the powdery white sand said to have been brought from Boracay to adorn its pool equipped with a wave and mist-making machine. Tropical cabanas once adorned the pool area, with the two-storey white mansion as the focal point. A presumed Presidential Security Group facility, a pelota court and treehouses once adorned the property. New San Jose Builders applied for barangay permits to renovate the site in 2000.

During Estrada's corruption trial at the Sandiganbayan, bank officers testified that Estrada bought the Boracay Mansion for his favored mistress Laarni Enriquez. Yulo, Estrada's adviser for housing affairs, facilitated the purchased of the Boracay Mansion using Estrada's "Jose Velarde" bank account. The Sandigayanbayan convicted Estrada for plunder in 2007 and sentenced him to reclusión perpetua.

== Forfeiture ==
Originally registered as the property of St. Peter Holdings, the property was forfeited by the Sandiganbayan in favor of the Quezon City government. The firm owed the city government in delinquencies amounting to ₱1.7 million. On September 15, 2005, the city government put the property into auction, but no firm placed a bid for the property. The city government tried to contact St. Peter Holdings at its registered address before the auction, but found out that the company was no longer occupying its given address at Strata 100 Building in Ortigas Center.

On a property title dated July 4, 2007, the national government stated that the Boracay Mansion was part of the "ill-gotten wealth amassed by former President Estrada which is the subject of the plunder case against him". In November 2007, the Sandiganbayan ordered the Quezon City government to relinquish its title to the property so it can be auctioned off by the national government.

For a time, the structure was used by Barangay Mariana, the adjacent barangay, as a waste-processing facility in August 2009.

A second auction held on January 26, 2010, following a failed bidding made five years earlier in September 2005, still did not gain any bidders and was also declared a failure. The property was then pegged to value at least ₱142.9 million, even though it was too deteriorated for residential use at that time. This prompted the city government to take full possession of the property for use by the Office of the Mayor. On the property, the Quezon City Reception House was built as the official residence of the Mayor of Quezon City, which later became the official residence and workplace of Leni Robredo during her tenure as Vice President.
