= Statement of assets, liabilities, and net worth =

Philippine government worker document

A statement of assets, liabilities, and net worth (SALN) is an annual document that all de jure government workers in the Philippines, whether regular or temporary, must complete, have it publicly notarized and submit attesting under oath to their total assets and liabilities, including businesses, financial and any other possible conflict of interests (such as being a part of a non-stock/non-profit entity such as foundation), that make up their net worth. The assets and liabilities of the official, their spouse, and any unmarried children under 18 who are living at home, must be included. Real property must be listed with the "description, kind, location, year and mode of acquisition, assessed value, fair market value, acquisition cost of land, building, etc. including improvements thereon". Any "co-mingled" assets, such as a house co-owned by siblings, must also be listed. Any gifts, donations, inheritances, or other properties received at no cost must be listed at the fair market value and the assessed value.

SALNs are required by law under Article XI Section 17 of the Philippine Constitution and Section 8 of Republic Act No. 6713, the Code of Conduct and Ethical Standards for Public Officials and Employees. It must be submitted upon or within 30 days of assumption of office and then every calendar year thereafter on or before April 30. SALNs must be made available for inspection at reasonable hours and for copying by the public for ten years after filing.

SALNs may be used by anti-corruption agencies, government watchdogs, investigative journalists, political opponents, or private citizens to determine if government officials have "unexplained wealth", i.e. wealth that cannot be attributed to a salary, investment, gift, inheritance, or other legal sources and therefore are likely to have come from bribes, kickbacks, grease money or other forms of corruption.

During the trial of Joseph Estrada, the 13th President of the Philippines, for plunder, his SALN played a key role. More than a decade later, the SALN featured prominently in the impeachment and eventual conviction of former Supreme Court Chief Justice Renato Corona. Six years later, his successor Maria Lourdes Sereno, the de facto first female Chief Justice of the Supreme Court of the Philippines was embroiled around the same issue.

Rodrigo Duterte did not make easily and publicly available all of his SALN during his tenure.

In 2025, Vice President Sara Duterte was impeached by the House of Representatives for, among others, failure to disclose her assets in her SALN, during which her wealth increased four-fold from 2007 to 2017.

== Public access ==
There are six custodians that keep copies of SALNs depending on the SALN filer, including the Office of the Ombudsman (for the President, Vice President, governors, mayors, and heads of constitutional bodies), the Office of the President (for cabinet officials), and the Civil Service Commission (for rank and file employees).

According to the Code of Conduct and Ethical Standards for Public Officials and Employees, the public has the right to know the assets and business interests of government officials and employees. Conditions for public access to an official's SALN is outlined in Section 8 of the code, and allows for such instances as for use of "news and communications media for dissemination to the general public". By law, copies of SALNs should be open for public inspection. In 1989, the Philippine Supreme Court declared, "Denied access to information on the inner workings of government, the citizenry can become prey to the whims and caprices of those to whom the power had been delegated."

Red tape, fees, and other requirements set obstacles in accessing a public official's SALN, making SALNs less usable as a tool for fighting corruption. These obstacles may be created by elected or appointed officials.

Obstacles include House Resolution No. 2467 by Speaker Gloria Macapagal Arroyo, which set extremely difficult requirements to get a lawmaker's SALN, rendering it "almost impossible" to use the SALN against corruption. In 2020, the Office of the Ombudsman under Samuel Martires issued a memorandum circular that further restricted public access to SALNs, requiring authorization from officials themselves before providing access to the documents. In 2021, Martires's proposed amendments to the SALN law was criticized as an attempt to escape transparency and protect corrupt public officials. In 2021, Supreme Court ruled that government custodians are allowed to set conditions on requests to access SALNs.

Prior to the 2022 Philippine general elections, freedom of information advocacy group Right to Know Right Now urged candidates to sign waivers to show their SALN to the public.

On October 14, 2025, few days after taking office, Ombudsman Jesus Crispin Remulla lifted the restrictions on public access to SALNs.
