= Trial of Joseph Estrada =

Trial of Philippine president Joseph Estrada

People of the Philippines v. Joseph Ejercito Estrada, et al.
- Court: Sandiganbayan
- Full case name: People of the Philippines v. Joseph Ejercito Estrada, Jose "Jinggoy" Estrada, Charlie "Atong" Tiu Hay Sy Ang, Edward S. Serapio, Yolanda T. Ricaforte, Alma Alfaro, John Doe also known as Eleuterio Ramos Tan or Mr. Uy, Jane Doe also known as Delia Rajas, John Does and Jane Does
- Decided: September 12, 2007
- Verdict: Estrada found guilty of plunder and sentenced to reclusión perpetua
- Citation: Criminal Case No. 24748
- Legislation cited: Republic Act No. 7080 or the Anti-Plunder Law

Case history
- Prior actions: Office of the Ombudsman filed charges of Plunder and Perjury against the respondent
- Appealed to: Supreme Court of the Philippines
- Subsequent action: Motion for reconsideration
- Related actions: Respondent was granted executive clemency by President Gloria Macapagal Arroyo, upon the recommendation of the Department of Justice

Questions presented
- Charging the respondent for the offense of plunder

Ruling
- Respondent was proven guilty beyond reasonable doubt of the crime of plunder defined in and penalized by Republic Act No. 7080

Court membership
- Judges sitting: Presiding Justice Teresita J. Leonardo-De Castro, Associate Justices Francisco Villaruz Jr. and Diosdado M. Peralta

The trial of Philippine president Joseph Estrada (People of the Philippines v. Joseph Estrada, et al., 26558 Sandiganbayan) took place between 2001 and 2007 at the Sandiganbayan. Estrada resigned from office in 2001 during a popular uprising in Metro Manila after an aborted impeachment trial in which he was charged with plunder and perjury. After his ouster, on April 4, 2001, Estrada and seven others were charged with plunder.

On September 12, 2007, the Sandiganbayan ruled Estrada not guilty of perjury while ruling him as guilty of plunder and sentenced him to reclusión perpetua. Co-accused Atong Ang pleaded guilty to a lesser offense, and Jinggoy Estrada and Edward Serapio were acquitted.

== Background ==
The Philippine Center for Investigative Journalism (PCIJ) ran and completed an investigation on the hidden wealth of President Joseph Estrada in 2000. PCIJ's report documented shell corporations, mistresses' homes and other assets worth $40 million, many acquired since the start of his term as President in 1998. The Estrada administration tried to pressure the media to not run the story.

On October 11, 2000, House Minority Leader Feliciano Belmonte Jr. filed the Articles of Impeachment in the House of Representatives, and held hearings on the "juetenggate" scandal. Testifying before the House, Ilocos Sur Governor Chavit Singson alleged Estrada's involvement in gambling payoffs, called Estrada "the lord of all jueteng lords", and alleged that Estrada took bribes from tobacco taxes. On November 13, 2000, House Speaker Manny Villar announced that 115 House members had endorsed the Articles of Impeachment, thereby transmitting the impeachment complaint to the Senate on charges of accepting millions in bribes from jueteng operators, graft and corruption, betrayal of public trust, and culpable violation of the Constitution.

== Charges ==
A few months after the January 2001 popular uprising that ousted Estrada, the Philippine Ombudsman filed two charges at the Sandiganbayan on April 4, 2001; one for plunder and the other for perjury.

Joseph and Jinggoy Estrada were the first elected officials to be so charged under the Philippines' Anti-Plunder Law. Jinggoy Estrada, who was the mayor of San Juan City at the time the plunder case was filed was the first incumbent elected official to be sued.

Joseph Estrada was accused of pocketing ₱4 billion from jueteng pay-offs and misappropriating tobacco excise tax funds. The plunder case consisted of four separate charges: acceptance of ₱545 million from proceeds of jueteng, an illegal gambling game; misappropriation of ₱130 million in excise taxes from tobacco; receiving a ₱189.7-million commission from the sale of the shares of Belle Corporation, a real estate firm; and owning some ₱3.2 billion in a bank account under the name Jose Velarde. The minor charge of perjury is for Estrada under-reporting his assets in his 1999 statement of assets, liabilities and net worth and for the illegal use of an alias, namely for the Jose Velarde bank account.

Estrada's son, Jinggoy Estrada, a former senator, and Edward Serapio, his personal lawyer, were his co-accused. Also charged were Charlie Ang, Yolanda Ricaforte, Alma Alfaro, Eleuterio Tan, Delia Rajas, and Jaime Dichaves, who was later added.

The plunder charge was based on a complaint filed before the Ombudsman by Dante Jimenez, human rights lawyer Romeo Capulong, trial lawyer Leonard de Vera, 1971 Constitutional Convention delegate Ramon A. Gonzales, lawyers Antonio Carpio and Dennis B. Funa. On January 22, 2001, two days after his implied resignation from office, President Estrada was ordered by the Ombudsman to file his counter-affidavit in answer to the complaints. Finding probable cause, the complaint was filed as Criminal Case No. 26558.

Joseph Estrada, Jinggoy Estrada, and Serapio refused to enter a plea during their arraignment in July 2001, which prompted the Sandiganbayan to submit a plea of not guilty on behalf of the accused.

Estrada's lawyers filed a petition before the Philippine Supreme Court to declare the anti-plunder law as unconstitutional; Joseph Estrada was a signatory of the law when he was senator. In November 2001, the Supreme Court upheld the constitutionality of the anti-plunder law.

== Trial ==
The Philippine government's prosecution team was led by Special Prosecutor Dennis Villa-Ignacio and other government lawyers.

The court heard 74 witnesses for the prosecution. Witnesses included former Equitable-PCI Bank officials Clarissa Ocampo and Manuel Curato and Ilocos Sur Gov. Chavit Singson.

Former President Joseph Estrada's defense panel was led by Estelito Mendoza and composed of former Supreme Court justices and other Philippine lawyers.

== Verdict ==
Initial reports of the nature of the conviction pronounced Estrada guilty of the ₱545 million jueteng case and the Belle Corporation case, while the other two charges were dropped. Estrada was sentenced to reclusión perpetua and was ordered to return to the government over ₱200 million funds funneled to the Erap Muslim Youth Foundation (named after Estrada's nickname "Erap") and ₱189 million Jose Velarde monies, the penalty of civil interdiction, and perpetual absolute exclusion from public office. The Court also ordered the arrest of all the other co-defendants in the case.

On September 12, 2007, Joseph Estrada was acquitted of perjury but found guilty of plunder and sentenced to reclusión perpetua with the accessory penalties of perpetual disqualification from public office and forfeiture of ill-gotten wealth. The decision declared the forfeiture in favor of the government: ₱542.701 million (bank accounts including interest), ₱189 million (Jose Velarde accounts including interest) and the Boracay Mansion in New Manila, Quezon City. The Sandiganbayan acquitted Joseph Estrada's son, Senator Jinggoy Estrada, and lawyer Edward Serapio of plunder charges.

Estrada returned to his villa in Tanay, Rizal (driven on a golf cart to a helicopter) with permission from the court.

In 2007, co-accused Atong Ang pleaded guilty to bribing a public official, a lesser offense that carried a lighter sentence.

Joseph Estrada is the first Philippine President to be convicted of plunder.

=== Appeal ===
On September 26, 2007, Joseph Estrada filed a motion for reconsideration of the Sandiganbayan conviction, alleging that the court erred "when it convicted him by acquitting his alleged co-conspirators." The hearing for Estrada's motion was set for October 19, 2007.

== Pardon and release from detention ==
On October 22, 2007, Acting Justice Secretary Agnes Devanadera stated that Joseph Estrada was seeking a "full, free, and unconditional pardon" from President Gloria Macapagal Arroyo. Estrada's lawyer Jose Flaminiano wrote Arroyo that Estrada was withdrawing his motion for reconsideration of the verdict.

On October 25, 2007, President Gloria Macapagal Arroyo granted executive clemency to Joseph Estrada based on the recommendation by the Department of Justice. Acting Executive Secretary and Press Secretary Ignacio R. Bunye quoted the signed order: "In view hereof in pursuant of the authority conferred upon me by the Constitution, I hereby grant Executive clemency to Joseph Ejercito Estrada, convicted by the Sandiganbayan of plunder and imposed a penalty of reclusion perpetua. He is hereby restored to his civil and political rights." Bunye noted that Estrada committed in his application not to seek public office, and Estrada was freed from his Tanay resthouse on October 26, 2007.

The chief special prosecutor for the case questioned Department of Justice's recommendation for executive clemency, stating that Estrada was disqualified from getting executive clemency under the Philippine Constitution.

=== Aftermath ===
In September 2007, chief presidential legal counsel Sergio Antonio Apostol and Francis Pangilinan, Senate minority leader and Judicial and Bar Council member, stated that Sandiganbayan Justices Teresita de Castro, Diosdado Peralta and Francisco Villaruz Jr. should decline Judicial and Bar Council nomination to the Supreme Court. Senator Jinggoy Estrada, Joseph Estrada's son and co-accused in the case, vowed to block to block the appointments of the three justices who convicted his father. In December, de Castro was appointed as the new associate justice of the Supreme Court of the Philippines.

In November 2007, Joseph Estrada opposed court seizure of his assets, alleging that he acquired the assets while he was still a movie actor. However, the Sandiganbayan stated that the pardon did not nullify the forfeiture of his assets, and ordered the seizure of wealth amassed from jueteng, an illegal numbers game. In January 2008, the Sandiganbayan reported that Estrada's Banco de Oro accounts remained intact due to the 2001 levy by BIR distraint - ₱1.107 billion ($1 = ₱41) account of Joseph Estrada: ₱500 million - "promissory note and chattel mortgage"; 450 million shares of Waterfront Philippines valued at ₱427.5 million; and 300 million shares of Wellex Industries worth ₱84 million; cash deposits in a common trust fund investment account of ₱95.76 million.

As of 2013, Joseph Estrada still owed the government over ₱P400 million, according to a Sandiganbayan compliance report.

== Reactions ==
Before the release of the judgment, Joseph Estrada told supporters not to protest in the streets.

President Gloria Macapagal Arroyo stated that the court's decision must be accepted. Arroyo canceled a scheduled attendance at a gathering of business leaders in Makati that afternoon due to security reasons owing to pro-Estrada protests.

The prosecution's lead counsel Dennis Villa-Ignacio asserted: "It shows that our judicial system really works. This is the last chance for the state to show that we can do it, that we can charge, prosecute and convict a public official regardless of his stature."

The Philippine Stock Exchange recovered from a two-day slump, closing at 3,307.60 points, up by 1.21%. The Philippine peso moderately strengthened against the US dollar.

The Philippine Chamber of Commerce and Industry said it will support a presidential pardon for Estrada. Jinggoy Estrada said "The people will receive this [decision] with moral outrage and disgust."

Estrada stated that "I thought the role of justice would prevail here but really it's a kangaroo court." Estrada's counsel Rene A.V. Saguisag issued the statement: "It's victors' justice. It's ruling class justice. The special division (of the court) was programmed to convict. We never had a chance."

== See also ==
- Corruption in the Philippines
- Surrender of Jinggoy Estrada

== Bibliography ==
- "FACTBOX-Key facts on Philippines' former leader Estrada". International. Reuters. 2007-09-11.
- "Philippine court sets date for verdict on Estrada". International. Reuters. 2007-09-07.
- "Security tight for Philippines Estrada verdict". International. Reuters. 2007-09-11.
- "Trial of Philippines' Estrada comes to a close". International. Reuters. 2007-06-15.
- Gopalakrishnan, Raju (2007-09-12). "Philippines' Estrada deadpan when sentenced to life". International. Reuters.
- Gopalakrishnan, Raju (2007-09-11). "Philippines on alert ahead of Estrada verdict". International. Reuters.
- Mogato, Manny (2007-09-06). "INTERVIEW-Philippines' Estrada confident of acquittal". International. Reuters.
- Mogato, Manny (2007-08-28). "Manila security forces prepare for Estrada verdict". International. Reuters.
- Mogato, Manny (2007-09-12). "Philippines' Estrada faces the spartan life inside". International. Reuters.
- Mogato, Manny (2007-09-12). "Philippines' Estrada gets life". International. Reuters.
- Mogato, Manny (2007-09-11). "Philippines' Estrada guilty of plunder, gets life". International. Reuters.
