= Casa Unisan =

Historic house museum in Bataan, Philippines

Don Antonio Maxino House
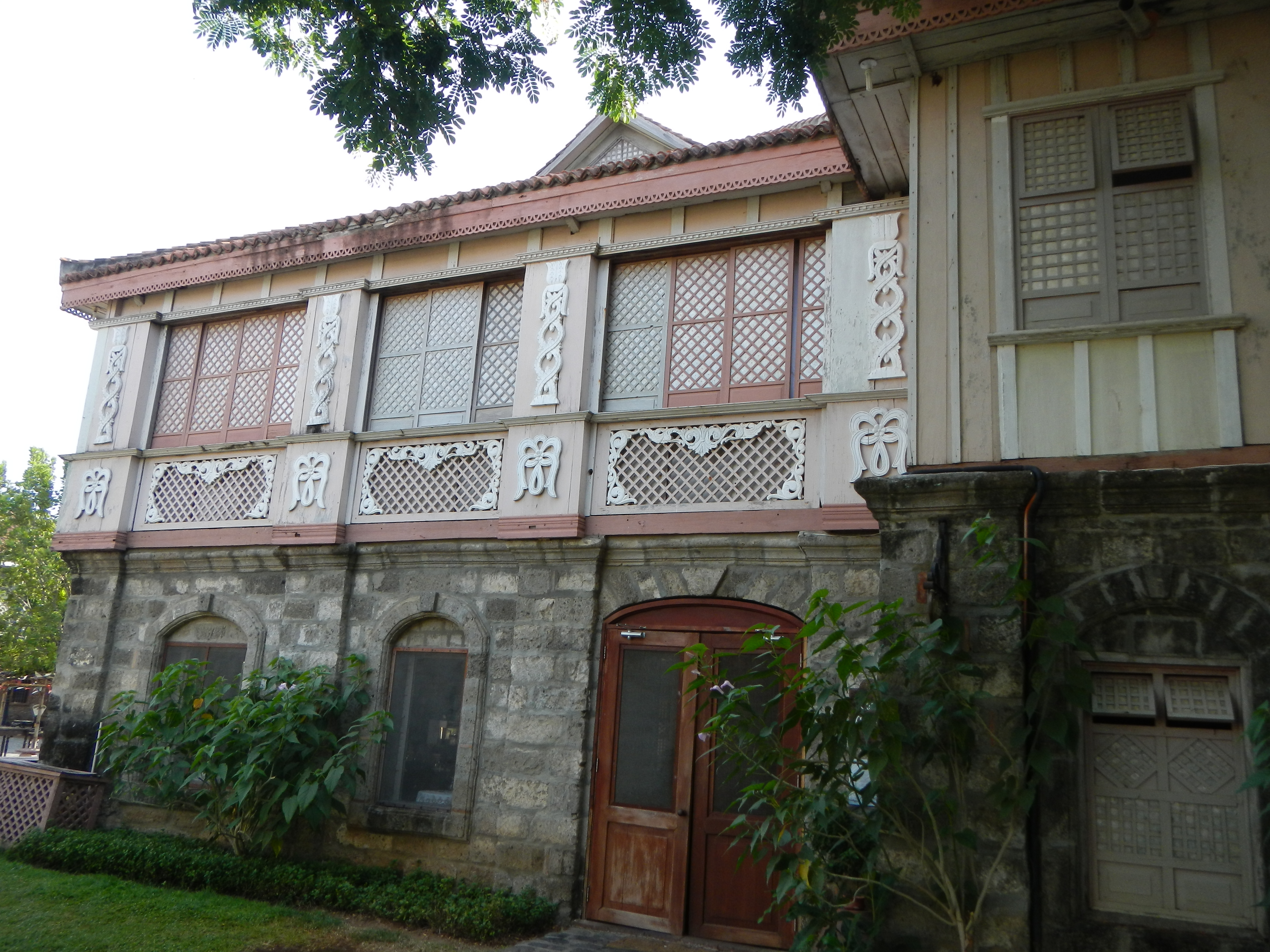
- Interactive map of the Don Antonio Maxino House area
- Alternative names: Casa Unisan

General information
- Type: Single-detached
- Architectural style: Bahay na Bato
- Location: Bagac, Bataan, Philippines
- Coordinates: 14°35′56″N 120°23′14″E
- Construction started: 1839
- Renovated: 2007

Technical details
- Material: Stones and Wood
- Floor count: Two

Design and construction
- Architect: Don Antonio Maxino

The Don Antonio Maxino House, also known as Casa Unisan, is a heritage house museum originally located at town of Kalilayan in Tayabas province (Unisan, Quezon at present). It was built in 1839 by Don Antonio Maxino. The house was claimed to be the first bahay-na-bato of the municipality. In 2007, the half-ruined house was sold to Jose L. Acuzar by a remaining family member. Unfortunately, the rest of the Maxinos were massacred by bandits, or tulisan.

== Architectural features ==
The ground floor of the Don Antonio Maxino house were lined with stone flooring while the flooring of the second floor was made of wooden planks. Each plank measures 14.8 metres (49 ft) long and 1.23 metres (4.0 ft) wide. The second floor of the house was surrounded with rectangular capiz windows. Unlike majority of the bahay-na-bato houses, there were no minor window openings, or ventanillas, below the capiz windows. This feature would improve the security of the house. The two paneled door into the living room, or sala, and the bedroom wing was decorated with a sunburst design.

The house was surmounted with four-sided, quatro aguas, tile roofing. An intricate system of rafters, or quilo, and king posts support the ridge, or palupo. The ridge bears the dead load of the tile roofing - laid out in Chinese style. In addition to that, there were two types of roof slopes present. These two pairs of roof slopes were built at different angles - providing two air vents at the apex of each sides.

The second floor of the house consists of two wings; the principal and the secondary wings. The principal wing consists of a living room, or sala, and bedrooms while the secondary wing consists of dining room, kitchen, and terrace, or azotea. A stone staircase (originally made of wood) was located in between these two wings - leading into the foyer, or caida. This layout of the stairs was in reference to Southern Luzon houses wherein the bamboo stairs were located at the rear portion of the houses.

The main facade of the house faces the street while the living room, or sala, was located behind. Its secondary facade is located on the perpendicular side of the street. It consists of the shorter side of the principal wing, the outside stairs, and the terrace, or azotea.

Its ground floor is now converted into a Filipino restaurant called the Marivent Café.
