= Quezon City Reception House =

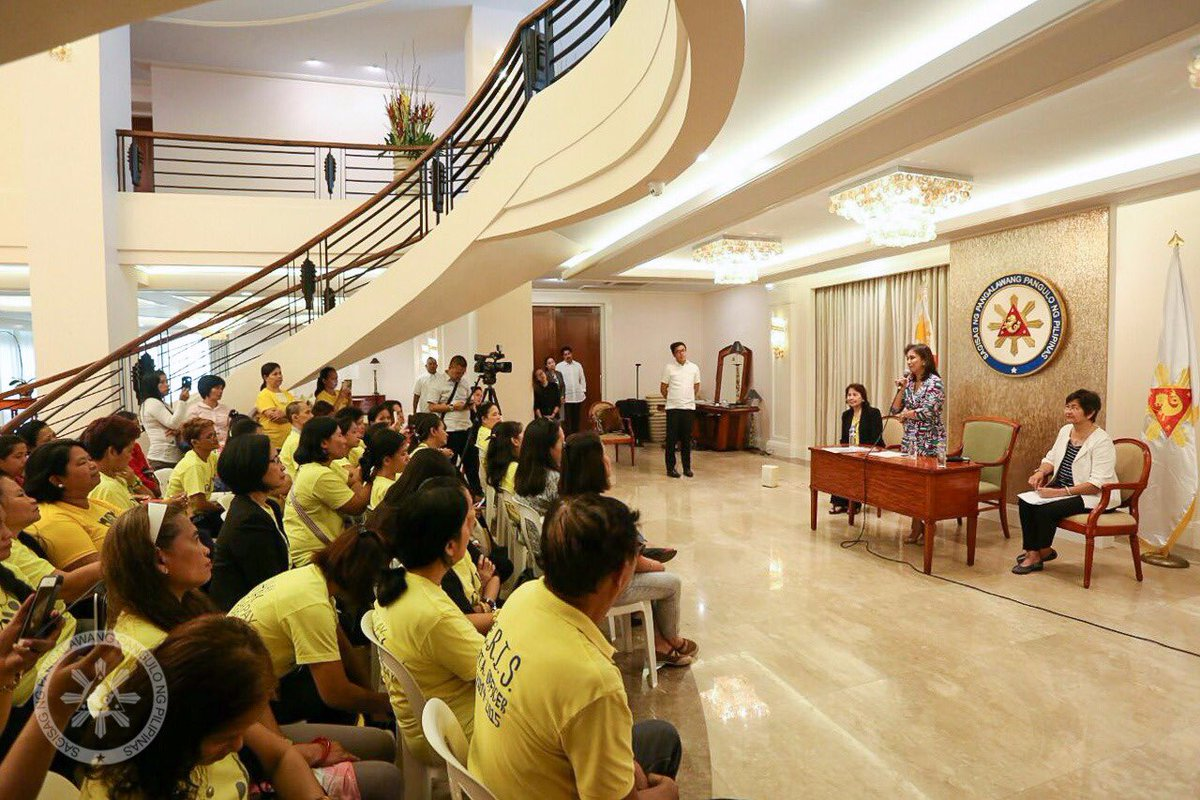
- Then-Vice President Leni Robredo holding a dialogue with beneficiaries of the Pantawid Pamilyang Pilipino Program at the Quezon City Reception House.
- Interactive map of the Quezon City Reception House area
- Former names: Quezon City Executive House
- Alternative names: Boracay Mansion^{A}

General information
- Type: Residence and Office
- Architectural style: Mediterranean
- Location: 100 11th Street, Mariana, Quezon City, Philippines
- Coordinates: 14.62275°N 121.0331682°E
- Construction started: April 5, 2013; 13 years ago
- Completed: 2016
- Cost: ₱90 million
- Owner: Local Government Unit of Quezon City

Technical details
- Floor count: 2

Design and construction
- Main contractor: Marigold Development Corp.
- (^{A}) Some media sources refer the building as the "Boracay Mansion", a residential building that formerly occupied the lot where the Quezon City Reception House stands.

The Quezon City Reception House is a reception house built and owned by the government of Quezon City to accommodate visiting dignitaries. It was built on the lot of the uncompleted and controversial Boracay Mansion. It was previously occupied by the Vice President of the Philippines from 2016 to 2022.

== History ==
=== Quezon City Executive House ===
Snippet of the Google Street View, showing the house under construction, 2014.

Originally named as the "Quezon City Executive House" meant to serve as an official residence of the Mayor of Quezon City and host foreign dignitaries and other guests of the local government, work on the property formally broke ground on April 5, 2013, and covered two stages.

With a budget of ₱45 million for the first phase, initial works on new structural foundations started on March 1 and was expected to be accomplished by August 28, 2013. The total budget allotted for the project was at least ₱90 million. The executive residence structure occupies only 900 square meters (9,700 sq ft) of the almost 7,200 m^{2} (78,000 sq ft) property and includes five bedrooms, four of which includes a full bath with a bathtub. The building's ground floor features three conference rooms, an adjacent facility with 8 office spaces for transient staff, and a museum of Quezon City's history.

=== As the Philippine Vice President residence ===
Then Vice President-elect Leni Robredo eyed the property as the new official seat of the Vice President; Robredo deems the house as a simpler alternative to the previous workplace of the Vice President, the Coconut Palace, which has proven to be expensive to maintain. Robredo's inauguration was held at the mansion.

In June 2016, after getting wind of then Vice President-elect Leni Robredo's search for a new official seat for her new role, Joy Belmonte, then-vice mayor of Quezon City, approached the transition team of Robredo and offered the Quezon City Reception House for Robredo's consideration. After an initial misunderstanding concerning then City Administrator Aldrin Cuña's press statement regarding the mayor's supposed disagreement, then-Mayor Herbert Bautista in a press conference at the Reception House denied being against Belmonte's offer and stated that his office would find it an honor to host the Office of the Vice President.

Robredo's chief of staff, Undersecretary Boyet Dy, clarified to the media that the Office of the Vice President was to still occupy its offices at the Coconut Palace and the Philippine National Bank Financial Center in Pasay until the expiration of the existing contract. By June 18, works by contractor Marigold Development Corporation in preparation for the Vice President's use are 80 percent complete. However, the Mayor's Office in the Reception House would already be made available for Robredo's use as early as July 1.

Robredo's successor, Sara Duterte, temporarily held office at the Quezon City Reception House. In July 2022, she later moved the seat of the Office of the Vice President to Cybergate Plaza in Mandaluyong, which is closer to the headquarters of the Department of Education in Pasig of which she was its secretary then. Duterte plans to establish a permanent structure for the post, as previous vice presidents have only held office in temporary locations.

== See also ==
- Boracay Mansion, a house which once stood on the same site.
- Malacañang Palace, the official residence and working office of the President of the Philippines
