= Paterno Ancestral House =

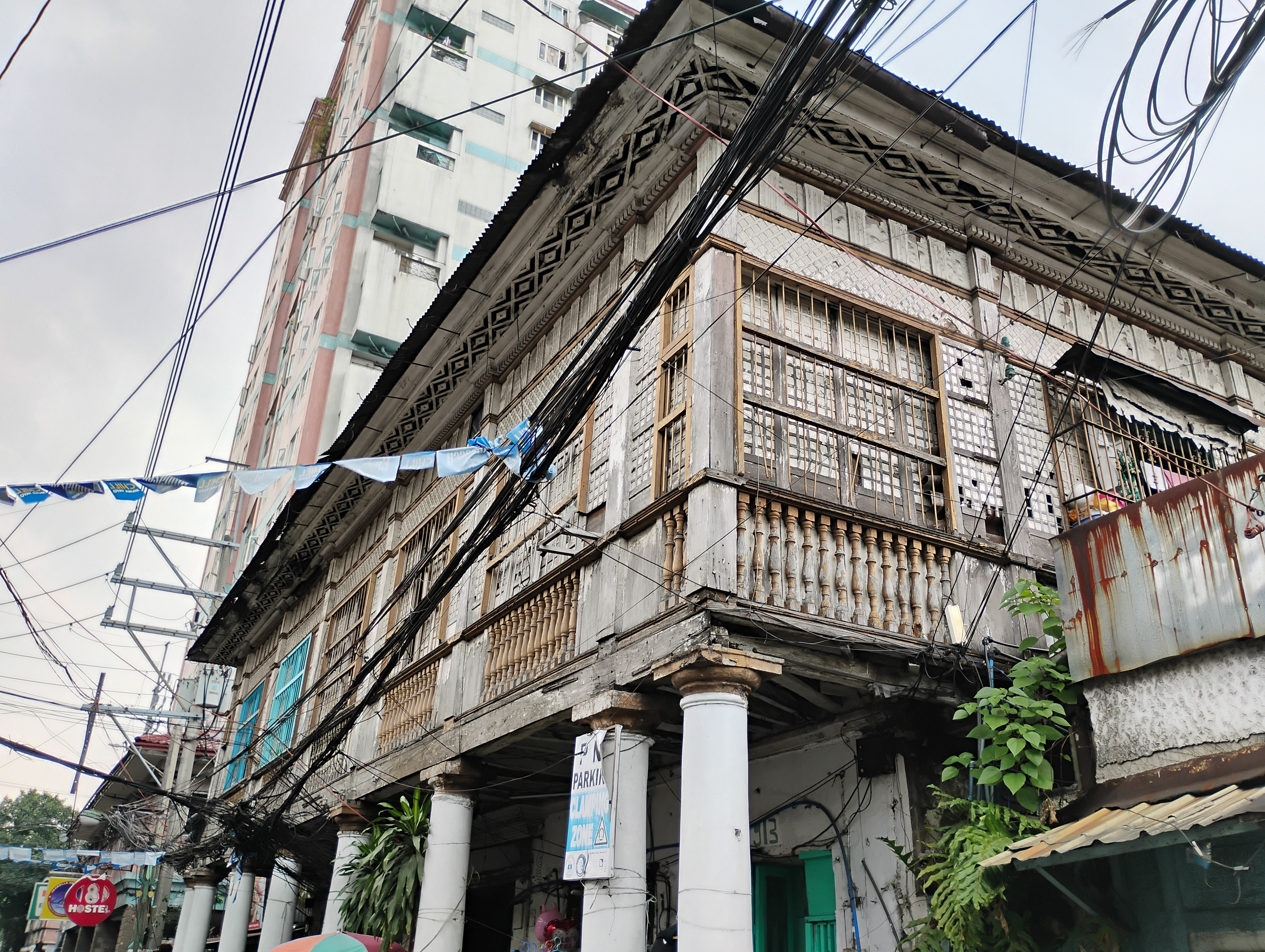
- The ancestral house in 2025
- Interactive map of the Paterno Ancestral House area

General information
- Type: Residential House
- Architectural style: Bahay na Bato
- Location: Hidalgo Street, Quiapo, Manila, Philippines
- Coordinates: 14.598942°N 120.987537°E

The Paterno Ancestral House is a historic house located in Quiapo, Manila, Philippines. The house dates back to the 1870s based on its materials and architectural style. It used to be the next-door neighbor of the Enriquez House which was then located on Hidalgo corner Cancer Streets.

== Architecture ==
This heritage house used volcanic tuff for the construction of its ground floor walls which was then banned due to the destruction it brought during the 1880 Luzon earthquake. It was assumed to be a little older than some of the ancestral houses along Hidalgo Street because of the use of adobe material. Most wood-and-stone style houses in Quiapo used brick instead which could be dated as post-1880. In addition, it avoided the post-1890 floral designs for a more subtle contrast of shapes and textures. The facade's fenestration is composed of simple capiz window panels in checkerboard pattern. Above this row of windows, on the transom, are non-operable capiz shells framed in wood mesh. This combination of wood and capiz contrasts the simple Tuscan stone columns that form a colonnade on the sidewalk along the street.

The 1,000-square-meter (11,000 sq ft) house has two courtyards, one is an enclosed courtyard located at the center while the other courtyard is in U-shape configuration located at the rear side of the structure.

== Existing Condition ==
The worsening condition of the house is now home to informal settlers. The granite paving of the ground floor has been ripped up.
