= New San Jose Builders =

Philippine real estate company

New San Jose Builders, Inc.
- Company type: Private
- Industry: Real estate
- Founded: 1986; 40 years ago
- Headquarters: Quezon City, Philippines
- Key people: Jose L. Acuzar (Chairman); Isagani Germar (Co‑Chairman); Cesar Sanqui (President)
- Website: www.nsjbi.com

New San Jose Builders, Inc. (NSJBI) is a Philippine real estate company based in Quezon City.

== History ==
New San Jose Builders, Inc. (NSJBI) was incorporated in 1986. Its initial project was to develop land and infrastructure for the National Housing Authority (NHA) in Bagong Silang and nearby areas in Caloocan. NSJBI would later fulfill projects by the government and develop and build its own residential condominiums.

== Projects ==
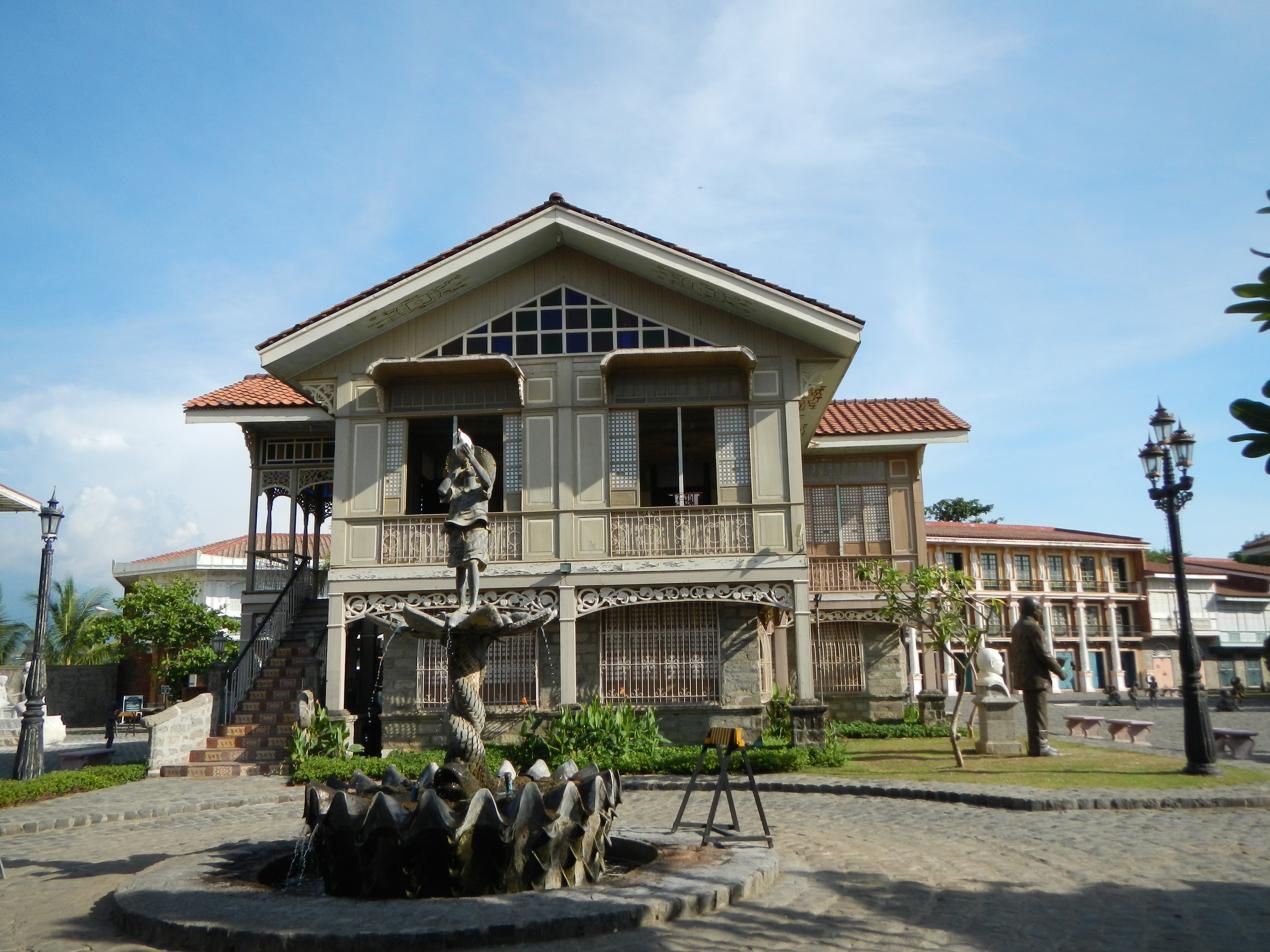
Las Casas Filipinas de Acuzar

Philippine Arena

The New San Jose Builders has strong ties with the Philippine government, having secured multiple infrastructure and housing contracts with the government. The company under Isagani Germar and Felicismo Isidoro was involved in several government projects such as Quezon City Hall of Justice, the Katarungan Village for Department of Justice employees, Government Service Insurance System (GSIS) housing, associated roads and facilities of Subic Bay International Airport, National Housing Authority (NHA) socialized housing and the Mount Pinatubo Lowland Resettlement Housing.

NSJBI was also involved in the renovation of the Boracay Mansion, a large residential building owned by former President Joseph Estrada.

The company has also built several residential condominiums in Metro Manila. It is also known for being involved in the construction of the Philippine Arena in Bulacan, the largest indoor arena in the world as well as for being the developer and contractor of the Las Casas Filipinas de Acuzar, a resort in Bataan known for its transplanted heritage buildings. The Bureau of Customs in 2017 cited NSJBI for non-payment of customs duties worth ₱1 billion for imported materials used for the Philippine Arena. The Las Casas' buildings are controversial for being transplanted and reconstructed from their original locations elsewhere.

NSJBI acquired the Manuel L. Quezon University in October 2014.

== Election campaign donations ==
New San Jose Builders donated ₱20 million to the campaign of senatorial candidate Joel Villanueva, which was the largest corporate donation to a senatorial aspirant in the 2022 elections. According to the Philippine Center for Investigative Journalism, the donation is a possible violation of the election ban on giving donations by corporations with active government contracts.

== Sports ==
The company organized the New San Jose Builders Victorias, a women's volleyball club which played in the 2016 Invitational Cup of the Philippine Super Liga.
