= Bagac =

Municipality in Bataan, Philippines

- Municipality
- Municipality of Bagac
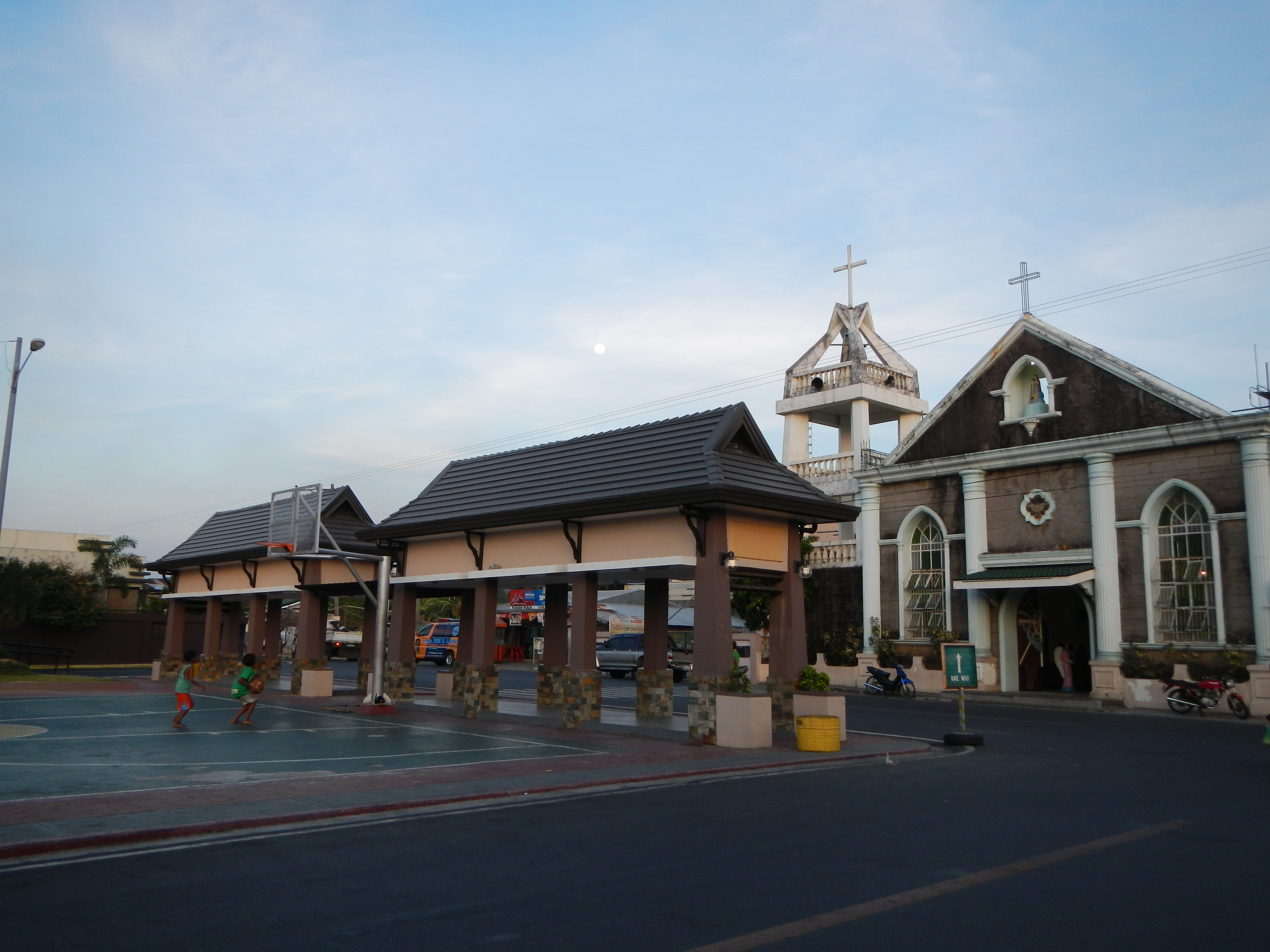
- Municipal Plaza

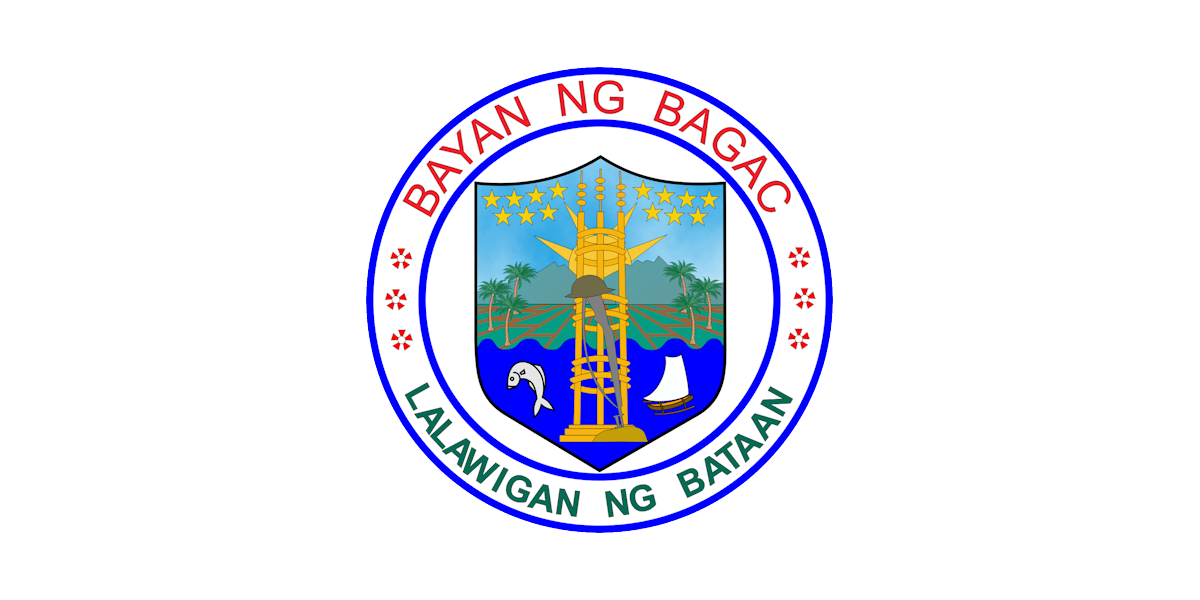
- Flag Seal

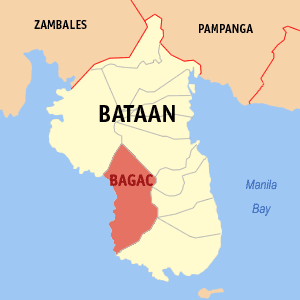
- Map of Bataan with Bagac highlighted
- Interactive map of Bagac
- Location in the Philippines
- Coordinates: 14°35′42″N 120°23′31″E
- Country: Philippines
- Region: Central Luzon
- Province: Bataan
- District: 3rd district
- Founded: 1866
- Barangays: 14 (see Barangays)

Government
  - Type: Sangguniang Bayan
  - Mayor: Ron Michael Alexis R. Del Rosario
  - Vice Mayor: Rommel V. Del Rosario
  - Representative: Maria Angela S. Garcia
  - Municipal Council: Members: Charlito D. Fernandez; Virgilio L. Alonzo; Larry D. Bantugan; Noel D. dela Rosa; Noel F. del Rosario; Guillermo C. Mendoza Jr.; Felix R. Tutol Jr.; Jason M. Nazareno
  - Electorate: 25,303 voters (2025)

Area
  - Total: 231.20 km^{2} (89.27 sq mi)
- Elevation: 74 m (243 ft)
- Highest elevation: 379 m (1,243 ft)
- Lowest elevation: 0 m (0 ft)

Population (2024 census)
  - Total: 32,799
  - Density: 141.86/km^{2} (367.43/sq mi)
  - Households: 7,583

Economy
  - Income class: 2nd municipal income class
  - Poverty incidence: 10.79% (2023)
  - Revenue: ₱ 236.6 million (2024)
  - Assets: ₱ 739.4 million (2024)
  - Expenditure: ₱ 197.4 million (2024)
  - Liabilities: ₱ 192.9 million (2024)

Service provider
  - Electricity: Peninsula Electric Cooperative (PENELCO)
- Time zone: UTC+8 (PST)
- ZIP code: 2107
- PSGC: 0300802000
- IDD : area code: +63 (0)47
- Native languages: Mariveleño; Tagalog

Bagac, officially the Municipality of Bagac (Tagalog: Bayan ng Bagac), is a municipality in the province of Bataan, Philippines. According to the 2024 census, it has a population of 32,799 people.

== Geography ==
According to the Philippine Statistics Authority, the municipality has a land area of 231.20 square kilometres (89.27 sq mi) constituting 16.84% of the 1,372.98-square-kilometre- (530.11 sq mi) total area of Bataan. Making it the largest municipality in Bataan by land area. It borders provincial capital Balanga to the north, Orion and Limay to the east, Mariveles to the south, and Morong and the South China Sea to the west.

Bagac is situated 25.80 kilometres (16.03 mi) from Balanga, and 151.79 kilometres (94.32 mi) from the country's capital city of Manila.

=== Barangays ===
Bagac is politically subdivided into 14 barangays. Each barangay consists of puroks and some have sitios.

PSGC	Barangay	Population			±% p.a.	
		2024		2010		
030802016	Atilano L. Ricardo	7.5%	2,447	2,224	▴	0.66%
030802001	Bagumbayan (Poblacion)	6.0%	1,978	1,766	▴	0.78%
030802002	Banawang	8.5%	2,784	2,690	▴	0.24%
030802003	Binuangan	1.9%	613	609	▴	0.05%
030802004	Binukawan	7.2%	2,356	2,293	▴	0.19%
030802006	Ibaba	5.1%	1,689	1,760	▾	−0.28%
030802007	Ibis	5.1%	1,660	1,407	▴	1.15%
030802008	Pag‑asa (Wawa‑Sibacan)	10.0%	3,271	3,456	▾	−0.38%
030802009	Parang	9.9%	3,248	3,073	▴	0.38%
030802010	Paysawan	2.2%	731	680	▴	0.50%
030802012	Quinawan	1.8%	574	553	▴	0.26%
030802013	San Antonio	4.4%	1,445	1,295	▴	0.76%
030802014	Saysain	8.7%	2,859	2,539	▴	0.82%
030802015	Tabing‑Ilog (Poblacion)	3.9%	1,281	1,223	▴	0.32%
	Total		32,799	25,568	▴	1.73%

=== Climate ===
Climate data for Bagac
Month	Jan	Feb	Mar	Apr	May	Jun	Jul	Aug	Sep	Oct	Nov	Dec	Year
Mean daily maximum °C (°F)	30.6 (87.1)	31.4 (88.5)	33.0 (91.4)	34.2 (93.6)	33.6 (92.5)	31.8 (89.2)	30.8 (87.4)	30.1 (86.2)	30.7 (87.3)	31.3 (88.3)	31.2 (88.2)	30.6 (87.1)	31.6 (88.9)
Daily mean °C (°F)	26.3 (79.3)	26.6 (79.9)	28.0 (82.4)	29.2 (84.6)	29.2 (84.6)	28.2 (82.8)	27.4 (81.3)	27.0 (80.6)	27.3 (81.1)	27.5 (81.5)	27.3 (81.1)	26.5 (79.7)	27.5 (81.6)
Mean daily minimum °C (°F)	22.0 (71.6)	21.9 (71.4)	23.0 (73.4)	24.3 (75.7)	24.9 (76.8)	24.6 (76.3)	24.1 (75.4)	24.0 (75.2)	23.9 (75.0)	23.8 (74.8)	23.4 (74.1)	22.5 (72.5)	23.5 (74.4)
Average rainfall mm (inches)	7 (0.3)	7 (0.3)	6 (0.2)	22 (0.9)	210 (8.3)	409 (16.1)	697 (27.4)	930 (36.6)	456 (18.0)	232 (9.1)	102 (4.0)	33 (1.3)	3,111 (122.5)
Source: Climate-Data.org

Bagac has a tropical monsoon climate (Am) with little to no rainfall from December to April and heavy to extremely heavy rainfall from May to November.

== Demographics ==
Population census of Bagac

Year	Pop.	±% p.a.
1903	1,310	—
1918	2,118	+3.25%
1939	2,958	+1.60%
1948	2,745	−0.83%
1960	6,889	+7.97%
1970	9,268	+3.01%

Year	Pop.	±% p.a.
1975	10,676	+2.88%
1980	13,109	+4.19%
1990	18,241	+3.36%
1995	20,906	+2.59%
2000	22,353	+1.45%
2007	24,202	+1.10%

Year	Pop.	±% p.a.
2010	25,568	+2.02%
2015	26,936	+1.00%
2020	31,365	+3.26%
2024	32,799	+1.08%

Source: Philippine Statistics Authority

In the 2024 census, Bagac had a population of 32,799 people. The population density was 140 inhabitants per square kilometre (360/sq mi).

== Economy ==
Poverty incidence of Bagac (%)

Source: Philippine Statistics Authority

== Tourism ==
- Bagac Friendship Tower — The monument, symbolizing the renewed friendship between Japan and the Philippines after the events of World War II, was erected by Risshō Kōsei Kai, a Japanese Buddhist organization. The tower was inaugurated on April 8, 1975, and is located about 200 m (660 ft) from where the Bataan Death March started. The 27-metre-high (89 ft) tower is composed of three pillars interconnected by several multi-layer rings. It located at the junction of the Gov. Linao National Road and the road to the Bagac town proper.
- Las Casas Filipinas de Acuzar — a heritage park built by José "Gerry" Acuzar, owner of the New San Jose Builders and antique collector. Inside this heritage park is a collection of Spanish Colonial buildings and stone houses (bahay na bato in Tagalog), planned to resemble a settlement reminiscent of the period. These houses were carefully transplanted from different parts of the Philippines and rehabilitated to their former splendor.

== Education ==
The Bagac Schools District Office governs all educational institutions within the municipality. It oversees the management and operations of all private and public, from primary to secondary schools.

=== Primary and elementary schools ===
- Bagac Elementary School
- Banawang Elementary School
- Binuangan Elementary School
- Binukawan Elementary School
- Colegio Santa Catarina De Alexandria
- One La Salle Educational Foundation
- Overland Elementary School
- Parang Elementary School
- Paysawan Elementary School
- Pinagsumilan Elementary School
- Quinawan Elementary School
- Saysain Elementary School
- W. V. (Wisdom and Virtue) Montessori School

=== Secondary schools ===
- Bagac National High School-Parang
- E. C. Bernabe National High School
- Saysain National High School
- St. Agnes Institute of Bagac

== Gallery ==
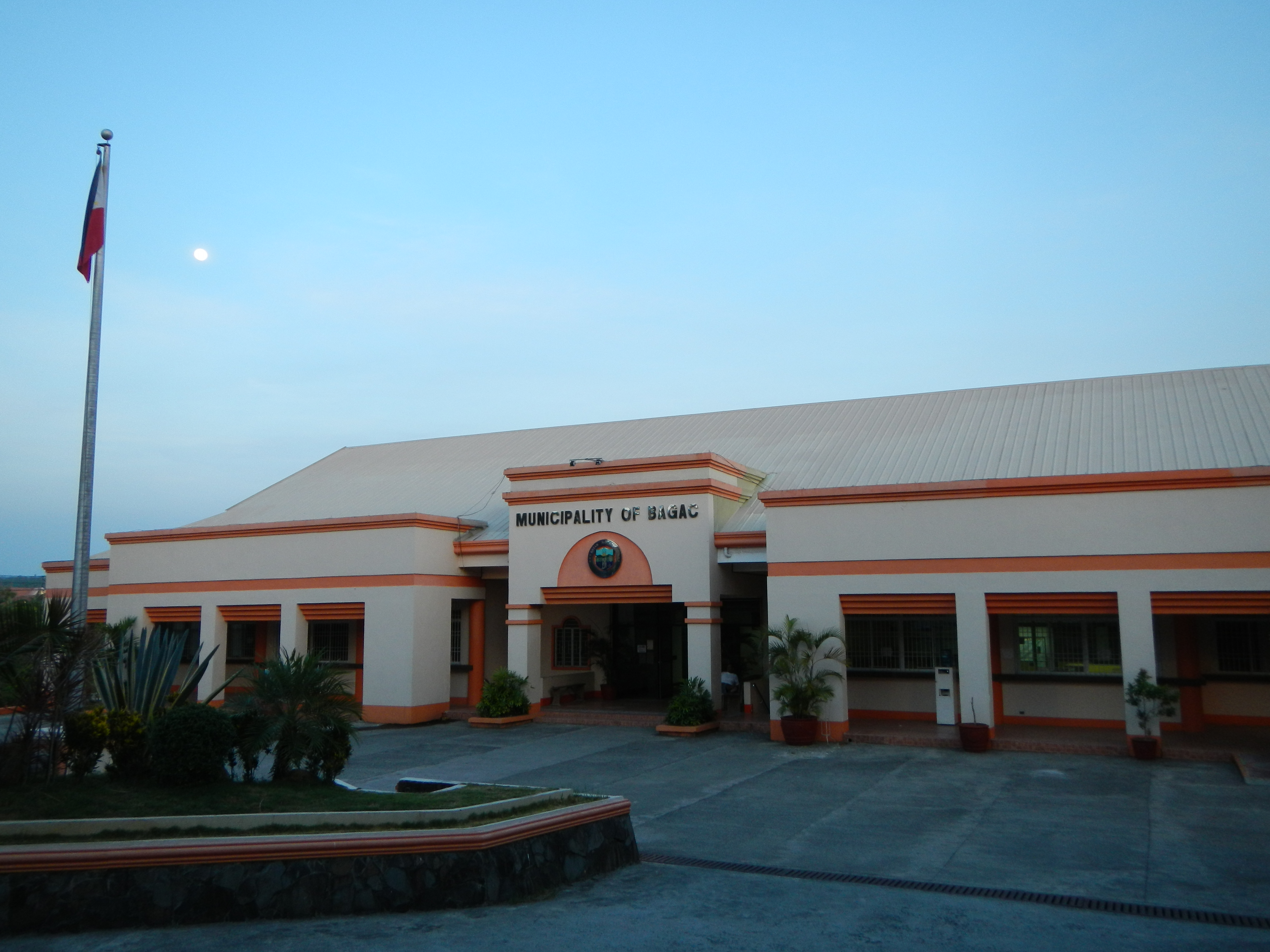
Municipal hall

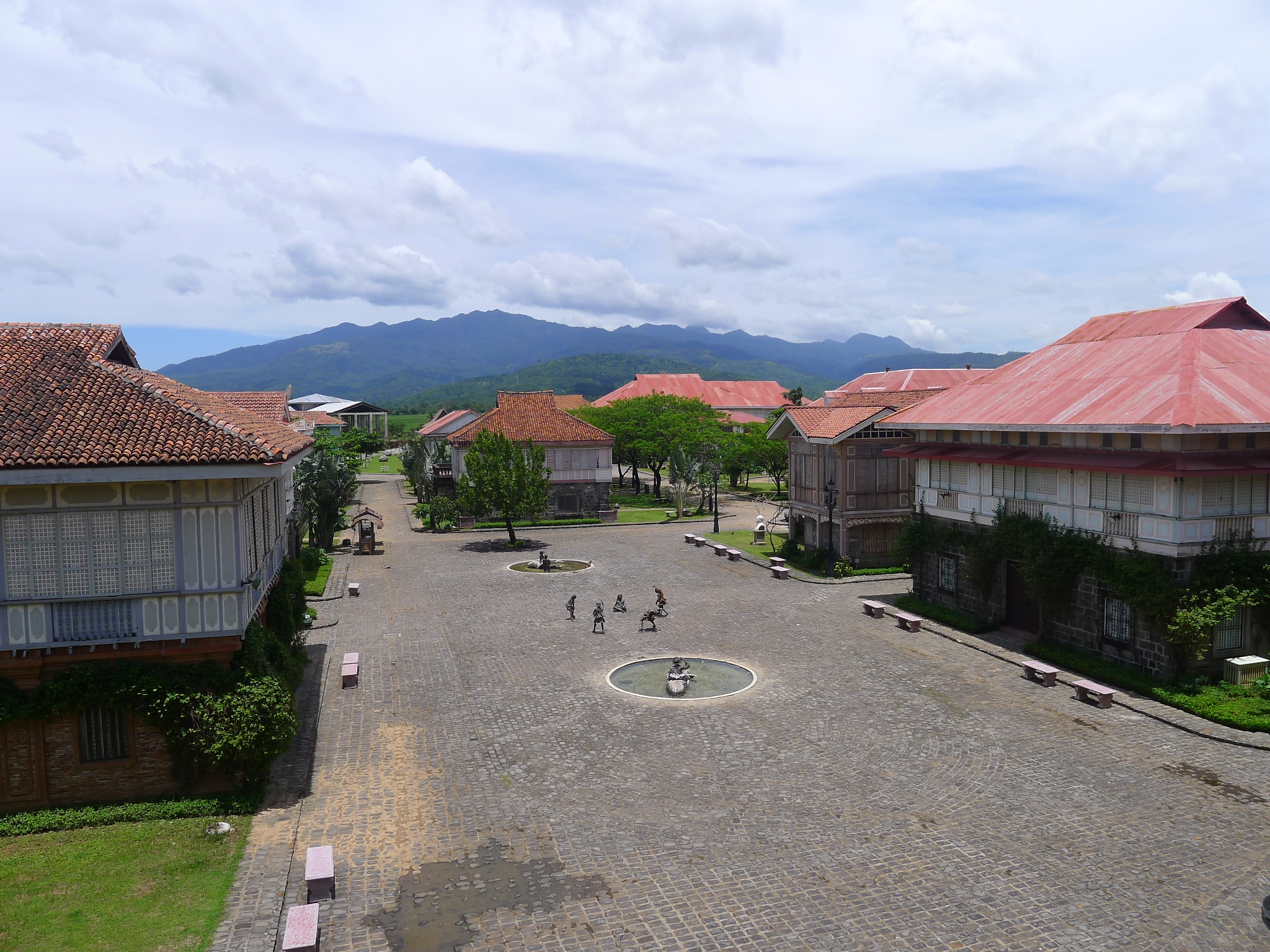
Heritage Houses, Las Casas Filipinas de Acuzar

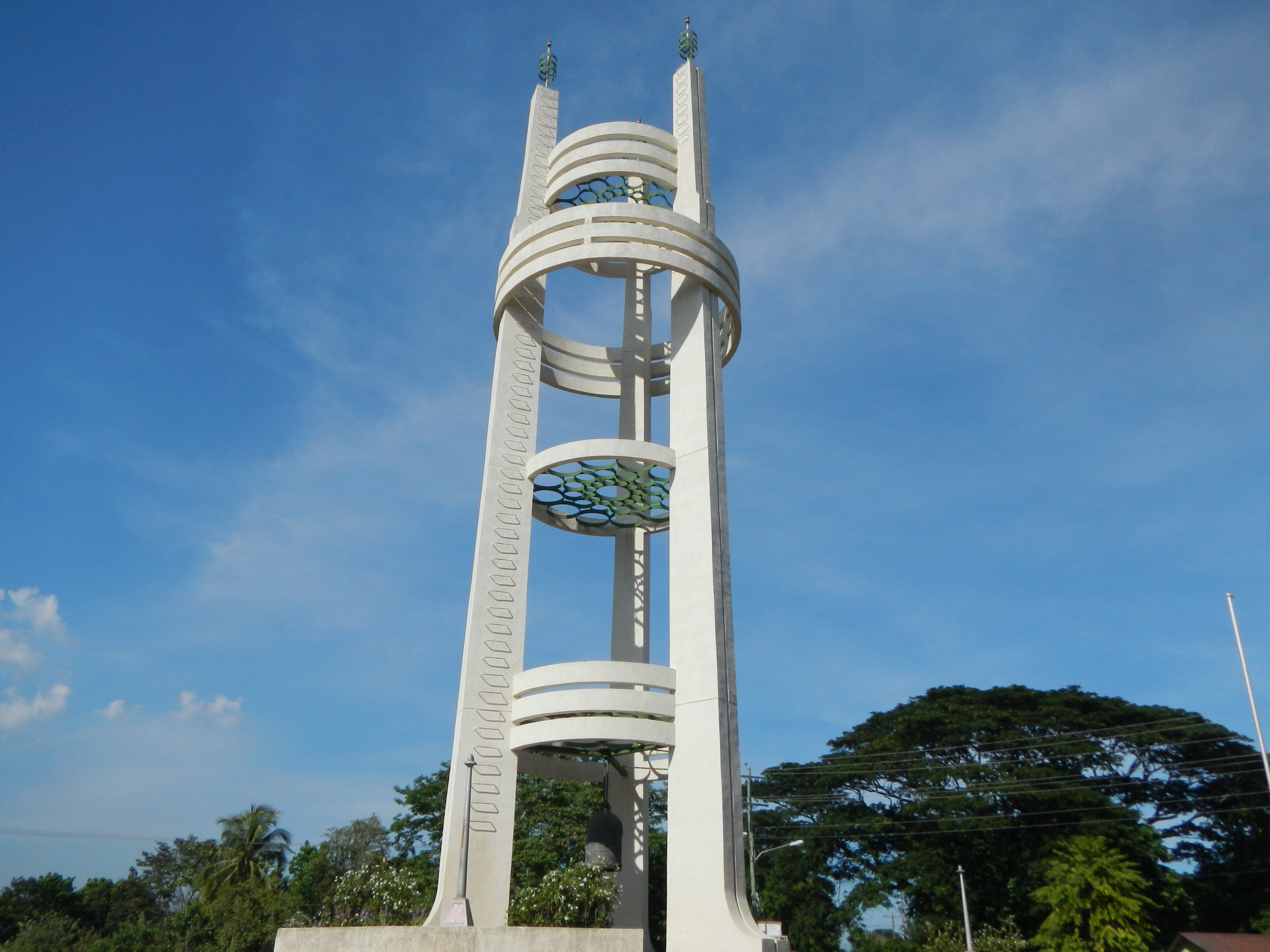
Bagac Friendship Tower

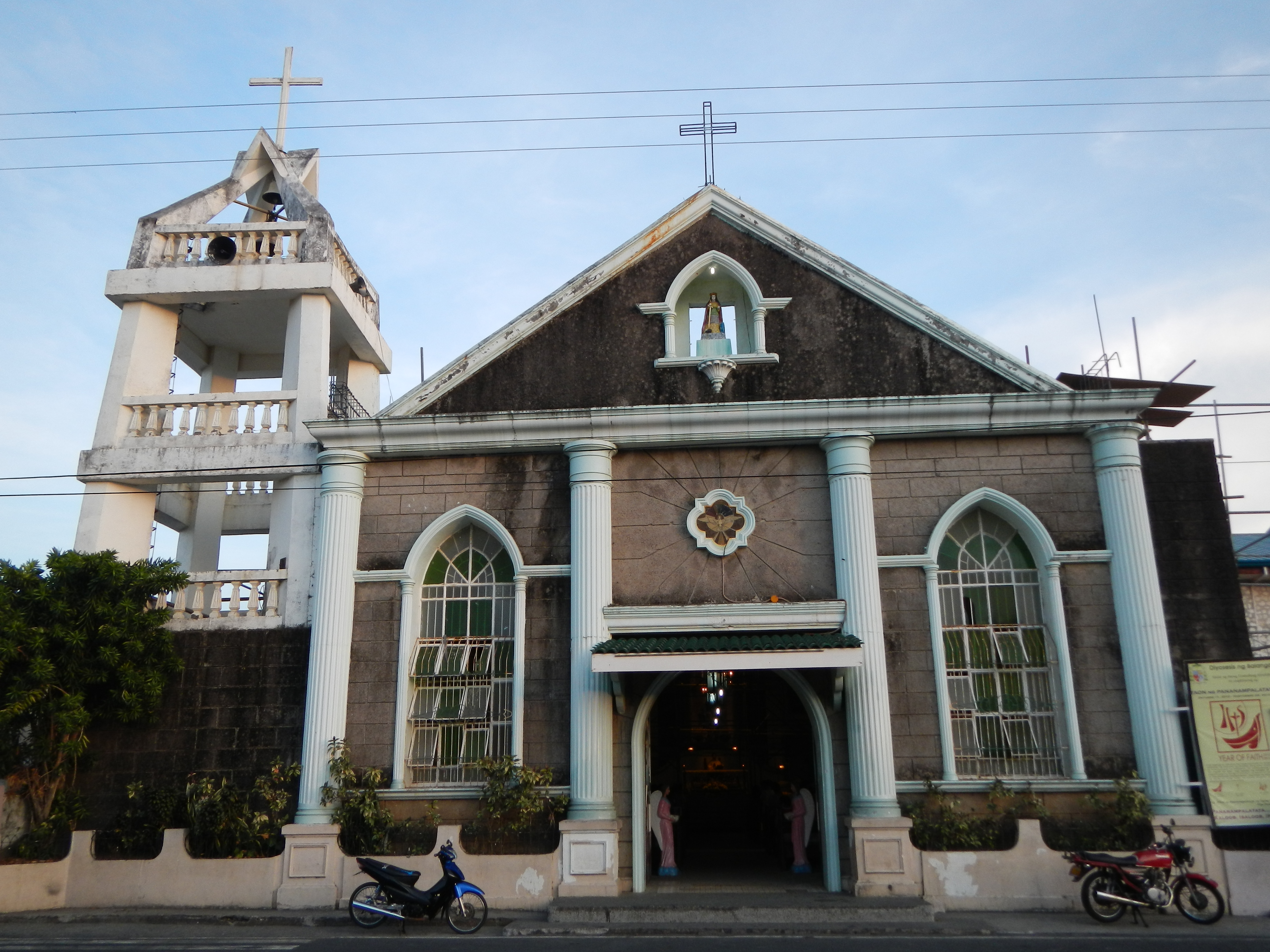
Saint Catherine of Alexandria Parish Church

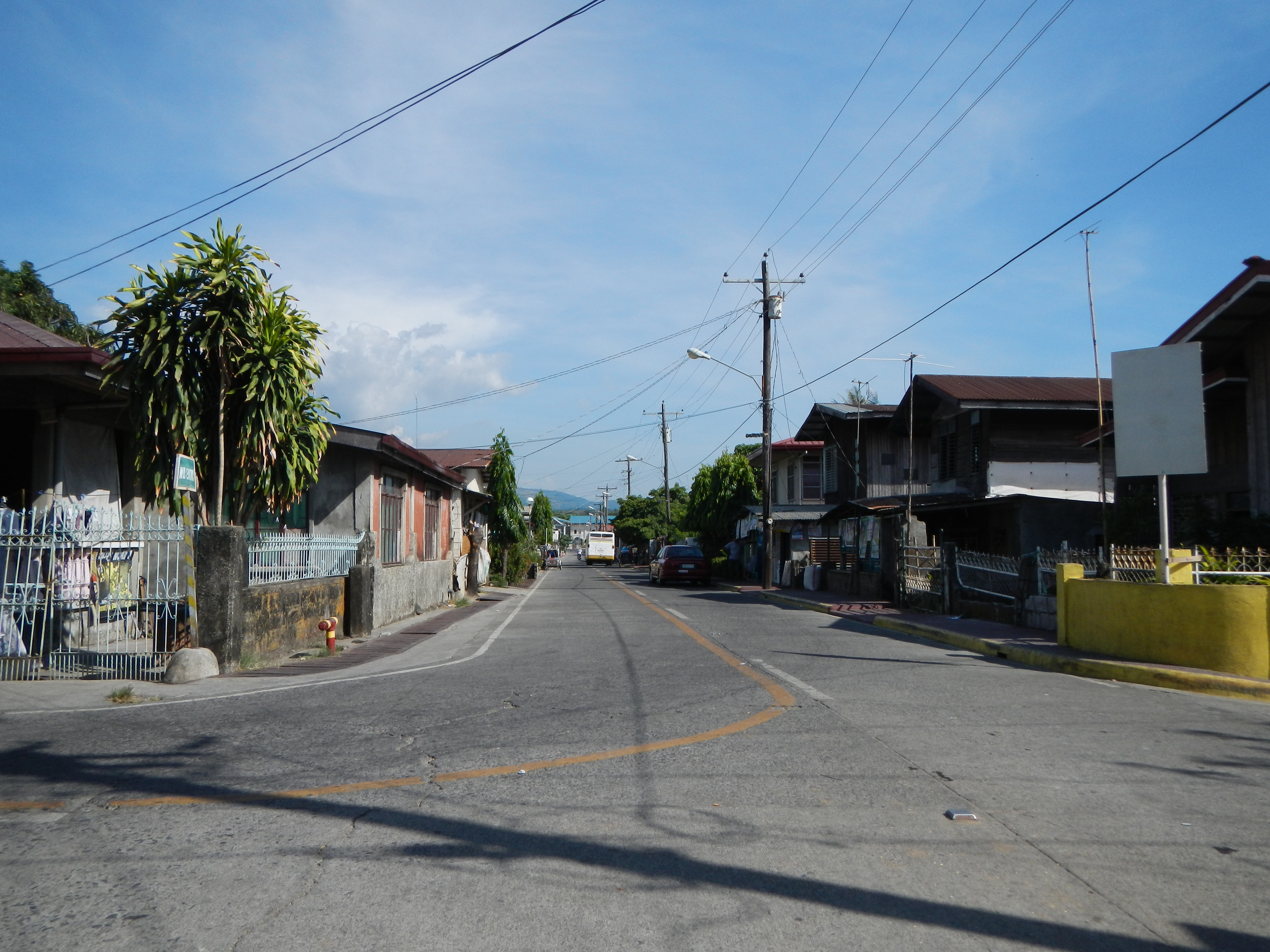
Street view
